= 2025–26 High Point Panthers men's basketball team =

American college basketball season

2025–26 High Point Panthers men's basketball

Big South regular season and tournament champions Boardwalk Battle champions

NCAA tournament, Second round
- Conference: Big South Conference
- Record: 31–5 (15–1 Big South)
- Head coach: Flynn Clayman (1st season)
- Assistant coaches: Ben Fletcher; Corey Edwards; Antoine Young; Anderson Clarke; Martynas Rubikas
- Home arena: Qubein Center

2025–26 Big South men's basketball standings
	Conf.				Overall
Team	W		L	PCT	W		L	PCT
High Point †	15	–	1	.938	31	–	5	.861
Winthrop	13	–	3	.813	23	–	11	.676
Radford	9	–	7	.563	16	–	16	.500
UNC Asheville	8	–	8	.500	15	–	17	.469
Longwood	8	–	8	.500	16	–	16	.500
Presbyterian	7	–	9	.438	15	–	18	.455
Charleston Southern	6	–	10	.375	15	–	17	.469
USC Upstate	5	–	11	.313	13	–	19	.406
Gardner–Webb	1	–	15	.063	4	–	29	.121
† 2026 Big South tournament winner

The 2025–26 High Point Panthers men's basketball team represented High Point University during the 2025–26 NCAA Division I men's basketball season. The Panthers, led by first-year head coach Flynn Clayman, played their home games at the Qubein Center in High Point, North Carolina as members of the Big South Conference.

== Previous season ==
The Panthers finished the 2024–25 season 29–6, 14–2 in Big South play, to finish as Big South regular season champions. They defeated Gardner–Webb, Radford, and Winthrop to win the Big South tournament championship, earning their first ever trip to the NCAA tournament. In the NCAA tournament, the Panthers would receive the #13 seed in the Midwest Region, where they would lose in the First Round to #4 region seed Purdue.

On April 10, 2025, it was announced that head coach Alan Huss would be stepping down after just two seasons, in order to take the associate head coaching position at his alma mater, Creighton. A day later, on April 11, the school announced that they would be elevating associate head coach Flynn Clayman to be the team's new head coach.

== Preseason ==
On October 15, 2025, the Big South Conference released their preseason coaches poll. High Point was picked to finish atop the conference, while receiving eight first-place votes.

=== Preseason rankings ===
Big South Preseason Poll
Place	Team	Points
1	High Point	80 (8)
2	UNC Asheville	68 (1)
3	Longwood	53
4	Radford	52
5	Winthrop	51
6	Presbyterian	37
7	Charleston Southern	27
8	Gardner–Webb	19
9	USC Upstate	18
(#) first-place votes

=== Preseason All-Big South Teams ===
Preseason All-Big South First Team
Player	Year	Position
Rob Martin	Senior	Guard
Scotty Washington	Senior	Guard

== Roster ==
2025–26 High Point Panthers men's basketball team
Players
Coaches

Pos.	#	Name	Height	Weight	Year	Previous school	Hometown
G	2	Vincent Brady II	6 ft 3 in (1.91 m)	195 lb (88 kg)	Sr	Missouri State	Indianapolis, Indiana
G	3	Rob Martin	5 ft 10 in (1.78 m)	170 lb (77 kg)	Sr	Southeast Missouri State	St. Louis, Missouri
G	4	Babacar Diallo	6 ft 6 in (1.98 m)	197 lb (89 kg)	GS	Kansas City	Dakar, Senegal
F	5	Terry Anderson	6 ft 6 in (1.98 m)	202 lb (92 kg)	GS	Lamar	Deer Park, Texas
F	7	Caden Miller	6 ft 9 in (2.06 m)	220 lb (100 kg)	Fr	Covington Catholic High School	Cincinnati, Ohio
F	8	Owen Aquino	6 ft 8 in (2.03 m)	230 lb (104 kg)	Sr	Liberty	Madrid, Spain
G	9	Conrad Martinez	6 ft 0 in (1.83 m)	175 lb (79 kg)	Jr	Arizona	Granollers, Spain
G	10	Dorian Grosber	6 ft 7 in (2.01 m)	200 lb (91 kg)	Fr	Alba Berlin	Luxembourg City, Luxembourg
F	11	Cam'Ron Fletcher	6 ft 7 in (2.01 m)	220 lb (100 kg)	GS	Xavier	St. Louis, Missouri
G	12	Scotty Washington	6 ft 4 in (1.93 m)	180 lb (82 kg)	Sr	Cal State Northridge	Los Angeles, California
F	14	Birgir Irving	6 ft 7 in (2.01 m)	215 lb (98 kg)	So	Rothesay Netherwood School	Garðabær, Iceland
F	15	Braden Hausen	6 ft 7 in (2.01 m)	213 lb (97 kg)	So	Amarillo High School	Amarillo, Texas
G	16	Liam Carney	6 ft 6 in (1.98 m)	198 lb (90 kg)	Jr	Providence Academy	Minneapolis, Minnesota
F	19	Josh Ibukunoluwa	6 ft 10 in (2.08 m)	219 lb (99 kg)	So	Willetton Tigers	Perth, Australia
G	23	Kasen Krueger	6 ft 1 in (1.85 m)	185 lb (84 kg)	Fr	Amador Valley High School	Alamo, California
F	24	Youssouf Singare	6 ft 10 in (2.08 m)	230 lb (104 kg)	Jr	UConn	Bamako, Mali
G	33	Mavrick Miller	6 ft 4 in (1.93 m)	180 lb (82 kg)	So	Houston High School	Memphis, Tennessee
G	35	David Fonville	6 ft 3 in (1.91 m)	198 lb (90 kg)	So	Providence School	Jacksonville, Florida
G	99	Chase Johnston	6 ft 3 in (1.91 m)	180 lb (82 kg)	GS	Florida Gulf Coast	Boca Raton, Florida

Head coach

- Flynn Clayman (Troy)

Assistant coach(es)

- Ben Fletcher (Troy)
- Corey Edwards (George Mason)
- Antoine Young (Creighton)
- Anderson Clarke (Concordia–Irvine)
- Martynas Rubikas (Cincinnati)

Legend

- (C) Team captain
- (S) Suspended
- (I) Ineligible
- (W) Walk-on
- Injured
- Current redshirt

Roster
Last update: October 20, 2025

== Schedule and results ==
High Point clinched the 12-seed after beating Winthrop in the Big South tournament, clinching their second ever Big South championship. High Point upset 5-seed Wisconsin in the Round of 64, earning their first NCAA Division I tournament win in franchise history.

Date time, TV	Rank^{#}	Opponent^{#}	Result	Record	Site (attendance) city, state
Exhibition
October 18, 2025*; 2:00 pm		at UNC Wilmington	W 99–98 ^{OT}		Trask Coliseum; Wilmington, NC
October 25, 2025*; 7:00 pm		North Carolina A&T	W 88–60		Qubein Center; High Point, NC
Non-conference regular season
November 3, 2025*; 6:30 pm, YouTube		vs. Furman; Field of 68 Opening Day Marathon	W 97–71	1–0	Rock Hill Sports & Events Center (473); Rock Hill, SC
November 8, 2025*; 5:00 pm, ESPN+		Averett	W 127–52	2–0	Qubein Center (4,872); High Point, NC
November 11, 2025*; 7:00 pm, ESPN+		Jacksonville	W 85–64	3–0	Qubein Center (2,786); High Point, NC
November 14, 2025*; 7:30 pm, ESPN+		at UAB	L 74–91	3–1	Bartow Arena (3,231); Birmingham, AL
November 17, 2025*; 7:00 pm, ESPN+		Canisius	W 93–50	4–1	Qubein Center (2,603); High Point, NC
November 20, 2025*; 2:30 pm, BallerTV		vs. UIC; Boardwalk Battle Semifinals	W 90–80	5–1	Ocean Center (449); Daytona Beach, FL
November 22, 2025*; 7:00 pm, BallerTV		vs. Incarnate Word; Boardwalk Battle Championship	W 91–80	6–1	Ocean Center (606); Daytona Beach, FL
November 29, 2025*; 2:00 pm, ESPN+		Western Carolina	W 93–73	7–1	Qubein Center (2,719); High Point, NC
December 3, 2025*; 7:00 pm, ESPN+		Southern Illinois	L 84–86	7–2	Qubein Center (2,497); High Point, NC
December 5, 2025*; 7:00 pm, ESPN+		NJIT	W 89–72	8–2	Qubein Center (2,293); High Point, NC
December 14, 2025*; 2:00 pm, ESPN+		vs. Appalachian State; Hickory Hoops Classic	L 78–86 ^{OT}	8–3	Shuford Arena (1,225); Hickory, NC
December 16, 2025*; 7:00 pm, ESPN+		Mary Baldwin	W 129–47	9–3	Qubein Center (1,498); High Point, NC
December 19, 2025*; 7:00 pm, ESPN+		La Salle	W 84–72	10–3	Qubein Center (2,058); High Point, NC
December 22, 2025*; 7:00 pm, ESPN+		Bryant	W 93–47	11–3	Qubein Center (1,973); High Point, NC
December 28, 2025*; 2:00 pm, ESPN+		Pfeiffer	W 123–64	12–3	Qubein Center (2,005); High Point, NC
Big South regular season
December 31, 2025; 2:00 pm, ESPN+		at UNC Asheville	W 87–69	13–3 (1–0)	Kimmel Arena (1,471); Asheville, NC
January 3, 2026; 7:00 pm, ESPN+		Longwood	W 80–67	14–3 (2–0)	Qubein Center (2,143); High Point, NC
January 7, 2026; 7:00 pm, ESPN+		Gardner–Webb	W 104–49	15–3 (3–0)	Qubein Center (3,414); High Point, NC
January 10, 2026; 2:00 pm, ESPN+		at Charleston Southern	W 84–82 ^{OT}	16–3 (4–0)	Buccaneer Field House (780); North Charleston, SC
January 14, 2026; 6:30 pm, ESPN+		at Winthrop	L 75–92	16–4 (4–1)	Winthrop Coliseum (1,956); Rock Hill, SC
January 17, 2026; 7:00 pm, ESPN+		USC Upstate	W 89–69	17–4 (5–1)	Qubein Center (4,790); High Point, NC
January 23, 2026; 7:00 pm, ESPN+		at Radford	W 93–83	18–4 (6–1)	Dedmon Center (1,118); Radford, VA
January 29, 2026; 9:00 pm, ESPNU		Presbyterian	W 84–81	19–4 (7–1)	Qubein Center (5,245); High Point, NC
January 31, 2026; 3:00 pm, ESPN+		at Longwood	W 71–59	20–4 (8–1)	Joan Perry Brock Center (2,588); Farmville, VA
February 4, 2026; 7:00 pm, ESPN+		Charleston Southern	W 80–55	21–4 (9–1)	Qubein Center (3,356); High Point, NC
February 7, 2026; 7:00 pm, ESPN+		Radford	W 86–77	22–4 (10–1)	Qubein Center (7,202); High Point, NC
February 12, 2026; 7:00 pm, ESPN+		at USC Upstate	W 95–70	23–4 (11–1)	G. B. Hodge Center (375); Spartanburg, SC
February 14, 2026; 2:00 pm, ESPN+		at Gardner–Webb	W 112–87	24–4 (12–1)	Paul Porter Arena (435); Boiling Springs, NC
February 19, 2026; 7:00 pm, ESPNU		UNC Asheville	W 74–48	25–4 (13–1)	Qubein Center (4,232); High Point, NC
February 21, 2026; 4:00 pm, ESPN+		Winthrop	W 89–87	26–4 (14–1)	Qubein Center (5,165); High Point, NC
February 26, 2026; 7:00 pm, ESPNU		at Presbyterian	W 79–73	27–4 (15–1)	Templeton Center (1,438); Clinton, SC
Big South tournament
March 6, 2026; 12:00 pm, ESPN+	(1)	vs. (9) Gardner–Webb; Quarterfinal	W 81–59	28–4	Freedom Hall Civic Center (1,715); Johnson City, TN
March 7, 2026; 12:00 pm, ESPN+	(1)	vs. (4) UNC Asheville; Semifinal	W 75–71	29–4	Freedom Hall Civic Center (1,927); Johnson City, TN
March 8, 2026; 12:00 pm, ESPN2	(1)	vs. (2) Winthrop; Championship	W 91–76	30–4	Freedom Hall Civic Center (2,109); Johnson City, TN
NCAA Tournament
March 19, 2026; 1:50 pm, TBS	(12 W)	vs. (5 W) No. 19 Wisconsin; First round	W 83–82	31–4	Moda Center (12,104); Portland, OR
March 21, 2026; 9:45 pm, TBS/TruTV	(12 W)	vs. (4 W) No. 14 Arkansas; Second round	L 88–94	31–5	Moda Center (14,385); Portland, OR
*Non-conference game. ^{#}Rankings from AP Poll. (#) Tournament seedings in parentheses. W=West. All times are in Eastern.

== Rankings ==
Ranking movements Legend: ██ Increase in ranking ██ Decrease in ranking — = Not ranked RV = Received votes
	Week																				
Poll	Pre	1	2	3	4	5	6	7	8	9	10	11	12	13	14	15	16	17	18	19	Final
AP	—	—	—	—	—	—	—	—	—*	—	—	—	—	—	—	—	RV	RV	RV	RV	RV
Coaches	—	—	—	—	—	—	—	—	—	—	—	—	—	—	—	—	—	—	—	—	RV

*AP did not release a week 8 poll.
