= List of Big South Conference men's basketball champions =

Big South Conference men's basketball tournament
- Conference basketball championship
- Sport: Basketball
- Conference: Big South Conference
- Number of teams: 9
- Format: Single-elimination tournament
- Current stadium: HTC Center
- Current location: Conway, SC
- Played: 1986–present
- Last contest: 2026
- Current champion: High Point Panthers
- Most championships: Winthrop (10)
- TV partner: ESPN
- Official website: Big South Conference Men's Basketball

The following is a list of regular season and tournament champions of the Big South Conference in men's basketball. The Big South has held a tournament every year since 1986, with the winner receiving an automatic bid to the NCAA tournament.

== Champions by year ==
Year	Regular season champion(s)	Record	Tournament champion	Tournament venue	Tournament city
1985–86	Charleston Southern	21–9 (5–1)	Charleston Southern	Savannah Civic Center	Savannah, GA
1986–87	Charleston Southern	21–9 (12–2)	Charleston Southern	Savannah Civic Center	Savannah, GA
1987–88	Coastal Carolina	17–11 (9–3)	Winthrop	Winthrop Coliseum	Rock Hill, SC
1988–89	Coastal Carolina	14–14 (9–3)	UNC Asheville	Winthrop Coliseum	Rock Hill, SC
1989–90	Coastal Carolina	23–6 (11–1)	Coastal Carolina	Winthrop Coliseum	Rock Hill, SC
1990–91	Coastal Carolina	24–8 (13–1)	Coastal Carolina	Civic Center of Anderson	Anderson, SC
1991–92	Radford	20–9 (12–2)	Campbell	Civic Center of Anderson	Anderson, SC
1992–93	Towson State	18–9 (14–2)	Coastal Carolina	North Charleston Coliseum	North Charleston, SC
1993–94	Towson State	21–9 (15–3)	Liberty	North Charleston Coliseum	Charleston, SC
1994–95	UNC Greensboro	23–6 (14–2)	Charleston Southern	Vines Center	Lynchburg, VA
1995–96	UNC Greensboro	20–10 (11–3)	UNC Greensboro	Vines Center	Lynchburg, VA
1996–97	UNC Asheville	18–10 (11–3)	Charleston Southern	Vines Center	Lynchburg, VA
1997–98	UNC Asheville	19–9 (11–1)	Radford	Vines Center	Lynchburg, VA
1998–99	Winthrop	21–8 (9–1)	Winthrop	Asheville Civic Center	Asheville, NC
1999–00	Radford	18–10 (12–2)	Winthrop	Asheville Civic Center	Asheville, NC
2000–01	Radford	19–10 (12–2)	Winthrop	Roanoke Civic Center	Roanoke, VA
2001–02	Winthrop	19–12 (10–4)	Winthrop	Roanoke Civic Center	Roanoke, VA
2002–03	Winthrop	20–10 (11–3)	UNC Asheville	Vines Center	Lynchburg, VA
2003–04	Liberty	18–15 (12–4)	Liberty	Vines Center	Lynchburg, VA
2004–05	Winthrop	27–6 (15–1)	Winthrop	Winthrop Coliseum	Rock Hill, SC
2005–06	Winthrop	23–8 (13–3)	Winthrop	Winthrop Coliseum	Rock Hill, SC
2006–07	Winthrop	29–5 (14–0)	Winthrop	Winthrop Coliseum	Rock Hill, SC
2007–08	UNC Asheville	23–10 (10–4)	Winthrop	Justice Center	Asheville, NC
2008–09	Radford	21–12 (15–3)	Radford	Dedmon Center	Radford, VA
2009–10	Coastal Carolina	28–7 (15–3)	Winthrop	Kimbel Arena	Conway, SC
2010–11	Coastal Carolina	28–6 (16–2)	UNC Asheville	Kimbel Arena	Conway, SC
2011-12	UNC Asheville	24-10 (16–2)	UNC Asheville	KimmelArena	Asheville, NC
2014-15	Charleston Southern	19–10 (13-5)	Coastal Carolina	HTC Center	Conway, SC
2015-16	High Point	24–10 (16–2)	UNC Asheville	Pope Convocation Center	Asheville, NC
2016-17	Winthrop	25-6 (15-3)	Winthrop	Winthrop Coliseum	Rock Hill, SC

=== Divisional Format ===
Beginning in the 2012–13 season, the Big South split up into two divisions of six teams each following the addition of Longwood to the conference in July 2012.

Year	Regular season champion (North)	Record	Regular season champion (South)	Record	Tournament champion	Tournament Venue	Tournament City
2012–13	High Point	17–14 (12–4)	Charleston Southern	19–13 (12–4)	Liberty	HTC Center	Conway, SC
2013–14	High Point	16–15 (12–4)	Coastal Carolina	21–13 (11–5)	Coastal Carolina	HTC Center	Conway, SC

== Tournament championships by school ==
=== Current members ===
School	Championships	Years
Winthrop	13	1988, 1999, 2000, 2001, 2002, 2005, 2006, 2007, 2008, 2010, 2017, 2020, 2021
Charleston Southern	4	1986, 1987, 1995, 1997
UNC Asheville	5	1989, 2003, 2011, 2012, 2016
Coastal Carolina	4	1990, 1991, 1993, 2014
Liberty	3	1994, 2004, 2013
Radford	3	1998, 2009, 2018
Campbell	1	1992
Gardner–Webb	1	2019
High Point	1	2025
Longwood	1	2022
Presbyterian	0	

=== Former members ===
School	Championships	Years
UNC Greensboro	1	1996
Armstrong Atlantic State	0	
Georgia Regents	0	
Davidson	0	
Towson	0	
UMBC	0	
Elon	0	
Birmingham–Southern	0	
VMI	0	
