= 2025–26 Winthrop Eagles men's basketball team =

American college basketball season

2025–26 Winthrop Eagles men's basketball
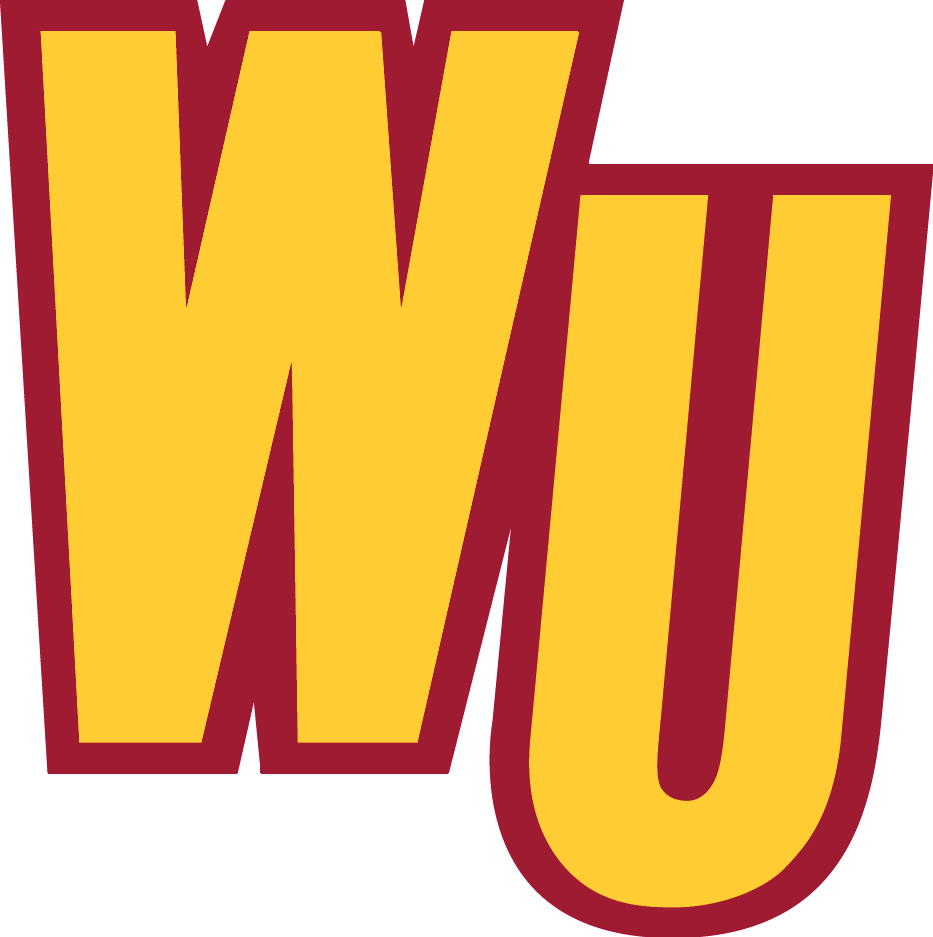
- Conference: Big South Conference
- Record: 23–11 (13–3 Big South)
- Head coach: Mark Prosser (5th season)
- Associate head coach: Tony Rack; Monty Sanders
- Assistant coaches: Mitchell Hill; Sid Crist; Matt Erps
- Home arena: Winthrop Coliseum

2025–26 Big South men's basketball standings
	Conf.				Overall
Team	W		L	PCT	W		L	PCT
High Point †	15	–	1	.938	31	–	5	.861
Winthrop	13	–	3	.813	23	–	11	.676
Radford	9	–	7	.563	16	–	16	.500
UNC Asheville	8	–	8	.500	15	–	17	.469
Longwood	8	–	8	.500	16	–	16	.500
Presbyterian	7	–	9	.438	15	–	18	.455
Charleston Southern	6	–	10	.375	15	–	17	.469
USC Upstate	5	–	11	.313	13	–	19	.406
Gardner–Webb	1	–	15	.063	4	–	29	.121
† 2026 Big South tournament winner

The 2025–26 Winthrop Eagles men's basketball team represented Winthrop University during the 2025–26 NCAA Division I men's basketball season. The Eagles, led by fifth-year head coach Mark Prosser, played their home games at the Winthrop Coliseum in Rock Hill, South Carolina as members of the Big South Conference.

== Previous season ==
The Eagles finished the 2024–25 season 23–11, 11–5 in Big South play, to finish in a tie for second place. They defeated Longwood and UNC Asheville, before falling to top-seeded High Point in the Big South tournament championship game.

== Preseason ==
On October 15, 2025, the Big South Conference released their preseason coaches poll. Winthrop was picked to finish fifth in the conference.

=== Preseason rankings ===
Big South Preseason Poll
Place	Team	Points
1	High Point	80 (8)
2	UNC Asheville	68 (1)
3	Longwood	53
4	Radford	52
5	Winthrop	51
6	Presbyterian	37
7	Charleston Southern	27
8	Gardner–Webb	19
9	USC Upstate	18
(#) first-place votes

=== Preseason All-Big South Teams ===
Preseason All-Big South Second Team
Player	Year	Position
Daylen Berry	RS Senior	Guard

== Roster ==
2025–26 Winthrop Eagles men's basketball team
Players
Coaches

Pos.	#	Name	Height	Weight	Year	Previous school	Hometown
G	0	Kaleb Evans	6 ft 4 in (1.93 m)	190 lb (86 kg)	Fr	Moravian Prep	Lexington, South Carolina
G	1	Isaiah Wilson	6 ft 1 in (1.85 m)	180 lb (82 kg)	GS	Richmond	Pittsburgh, Pennsylvania
G	2	Kareem Rozier	5 ft 9 in (1.75 m)	160 lb (73 kg)	Sr	Duquesne	Detroit, Michigan
G	3	Josh Meo	6 ft 4 in (1.93 m)	195 lb (88 kg)	Sr	Coastal Carolina	Orlando, Florida
G	4	Pharrell Boyogueno	6 ft 6 in (1.98 m)	215 lb (98 kg)	Sr	Gardner–Webb	Greenville, South Carolina
G	5	Braylhan Thomas	6 ft 6 in (1.98 m)	205 lb (93 kg)	So	Georgia Southern	Atlanta, Georgia
G	7	Daylen Berry	6 ft 4 in (1.93 m)	175 lb (79 kg)	RS Sr	Charleston Southern	Raleigh, North Carolina
G	8	Cam Christy	6 ft 4 in (1.93 m)	200 lb (91 kg)	Sr	Mount St. Joseph	Walton, Kentucky
G	11	Kody Clouet	6 ft 5 in (1.96 m)	210 lb (95 kg)	GS	San Diego	San Marcos, California
F	15	Tommy Kamarad	6 ft 8 in (2.03 m)	205 lb (93 kg)	GS	Arkansas Tech	Buford, Georgia
F	21	Tai Hamilton	6 ft 10 in (2.08 m)	200 lb (91 kg)	Jr	William & Mary	Charlotte, North Carolina
G	22	Henry Harrison	5 ft 11 in (1.8 m)	175 lb (79 kg)	Jr	Lewisburg High School	Lewisburg, Pennsylvania
F	23	Ed Nnamoko	6 ft 10 in (2.08 m)	230 lb (104 kg)	Sr	New Mexico State	Lagos, Nigeria
G	25	Seifeldin Hendawy	6 ft 8 in (2.03 m)	200 lb (91 kg)	So	Loyola Chicago	Cairo, Egypt
C	51	Logan Duncomb	6 ft 10 in (2.08 m)	230 lb (104 kg)	Sr	Xavier	Cincinnati, Ohio

Head coach

- Mark Prosser (Marist)

Assistant coach(es)

- Tony Rack (Northern Kentucky)
- Monty Sanders (Elon)
- Mitchell Hill (Tennessee Tech)
- Sid Crist (Glenville State)
- Matt Erps (Winthrop)

Legend

- (C) Team captain
- (S) Suspended
- (I) Ineligible
- (W) Walk-on
- Injured
- Current redshirt

Roster
Last update: October 22, 2025

== Schedule and results ==
Date time, TV	Rank^{#}	Opponent^{#}	Result	Record	Site (attendance) city, state
Exhibition
October 25, 2025*; 6:30 pm		Georgia Southern	W 96–91	–	Winthrop Coliseum; Rock Hill, SC
Non-conference regular season
November 3, 2025*; 8:00 am, YouTube		vs. Queens; Field of 68 Opening Day Marathon	W 81–74	1–0	Rock Hill Sports & Event Center (1,300); Rock Hill, SC
November 7, 2025*; 7:00 pm, ESPN+		at George Mason	L 90–96	1–1	EagleBank Arena (2,933); Fairfax, VA
November 11, 2025*; 7:00 pm, ESPN+		at Coastal Carolina	L 66–72	1–2	HTC Center (2,663); Conway, SC
November 15, 2025*; 2:00 pm, ESPN+		Mercer	W 105–69	2–2	Winthrop Coliseum (2,637); Rock Hill, SC
November 18, 2025*; 8:00 pm, SECN+		at No. 21 Arkansas	L 83–84	2–3	Bud Walton Arena (19,200); Fayetteville, AR
November 23, 2025*; 8:00 pm, SWAC TV		at Jackson State	W 80–62	3–3	Williams Assembly Center (506); Jackson, MS
November 25, 2025*; 8:30 pm, BTN		at Nebraska	L 73–80	3–4	Pinnacle Bank Arena (13,973); Lincoln, NE
November 29, 2025*; 4:00 pm, ESPN+		South Carolina State	W 101–79	4–4	Winthrop Coliseum (1,131); Rock Hill, SC
December 2, 2025*; 7:30 pm, NEC Front Row		at LIU	W 94–92 ^{OT}	5–4	Steinberg Wellness Center (403); Brooklyn, NY
December 6, 2025*; 2:00 pm, ESPN+		Coastal Carolina	L 84–88	5–5	Winthrop Coliseum (1,626); Rock Hill, SC
December 9, 2025*; 6:30 pm, ESPN+		Toccoa Falls	W 111–62	6–5	Winthrop Coliseum (854); Rock Hill, SC
December 13, 2025*; 6:30 pm, ESPN+		Bob Jones	W 101–55	7–5	Winthrop Coliseum (1,031); Rock Hill, SC
December 18, 2025*; 8:00 pm, SLN		at North Dakota	L 88–90	7–6	Betty Engelstad Sioux Center (312); Grand Forks, ND
December 21, 2025*; 12:00 pm, ESPN+		Clinton	W 107−41	8−6	Winthrop Coliseum (1,153); Rock Hill, SC
December 28, 2025*; 2:00 pm, TNT		at No. 15 Texas Tech	L 57–87	8–7	United Supermarkets Arena (12,814); Lubbock, TX
Big South regular season
December 31, 2025; 3:00 pm, ESPN+		at Longwood	L 70–82	8–8 (0–1)	Joan Perry Brock Center (1,913); Farmville, VA
January 3, 2026; 4:00 pm, ESPN+		Gardner–Webb	W 88–77	9–8 (1–1)	Winthrop Coliseum (1,234); Rock Hill, SC
January 7, 2026; 6:30 pm, ESPN+		Charleston Southern	W 81–77	10–8 (2–1)	Winthrop Coliseum (1,057); Rock Hill, SC
January 10, 2026; 2:00 pm, ESPN+		at USC Upstate	W 71–50	11–8 (3–1)	G. B. Hodge Center (404); Spartanburg, SC
January 14, 2026; 6:30 pm, ESPN+		High Point	W 92–75	12–8 (4–1)	Winthrop Coliseum (1,956); Rock Hill, SC
January 17, 2026; 2:00 pm, ESPN+		at UNC Asheville	W 69–67	13–8 (5–1)	Kimmel Arena (1,496); Asheville, NC
January 21, 2026; 6:30 pm, ESPN+		Radford	W 76–75	14–8 (6–1)	Winthrop Coliseum (1,551); Rock Hill, SC
January 24, 2026; 4:30 pm, ESPN+		at Presbyterian	W 82–72	15–8 (7–1)	Templeton Center (647); Clinton, SC
January 31, 2026; 2:00 pm, ESPN+		UNC Asheville	W 84−71	16−8 (8−1)	Winthrop Coliseum (1,400); Rock Hill, SC
February 4, 2026; 7:00 pm, ESPN+		at Radford	W 80–78	17–8 (9–1)	Dedmon Center (1,814); Radford, VA
February 7, 2026; 2:00 pm, ESPN+		Longwood	W 79–74	18–8 (10–1)	Winthrop Coliseum (2,041); Rock Hill, SC
February 12, 2026; 7:00 pm, ESPN+		at Gardner–Webb	W 103–85	19–8 (11–1)	Paul Porter Arena (355); Boiling Springs, NC
February 19, 2026; 6:30 pm, ESPN+		USC Upstate	W 68–64	20–8 (12–1)	Winthrop Coliseum (1,932); Rock Hill, SC
February 21, 2026; 4:00 pm, ESPN+		at High Point	L 87–89	20–9 (12–2)	Qubein Center (5,165); High Point, NC
February 26, 2026; 7:00 pm, ESPN+		at Charleston Southern	L 84–86	20–10 (12–3)	Buccaneer Field House (902); North Charleston, SC
February 28, 2026; 4:00 pm, ESPN+		Presbyterian	W 74–70	21–10 (13–3)	Winthrop Coliseum (2,403); Rock Hill, SC
Big South tournament
March 6, 2026; 2:30 pm, ESPN+	(2)	vs. (7) Charleston Southern; Quarterfinals	W 86–81	22–10	Freedom Hall Civic Center (1,715); Johnson City, TN
March 7, 2026; 2:30 pm, ESPN+	(2)	vs. (6) Presbyterian; Semifinals	W 73–71	23–10	Freedom Hall Civic Center (1,927); Johnson City, TN
March 8, 2026; 12:00 pm, ESPN+	(2)	vs. (1) High Point; Championship	L 76–91	23–11	Freedom Hall Civic Center (2,109); Johnson City, TN
*Non-conference game. ^{#}Rankings from AP Poll. (#) Tournament seedings in parentheses. All times are in Eastern.
