= 2025–26 Gardner–Webb Runnin' Bulldogs men's basketball team =

American college basketball season

2025–26 Gardner–Webb Runnin' Bulldogs men's basketball
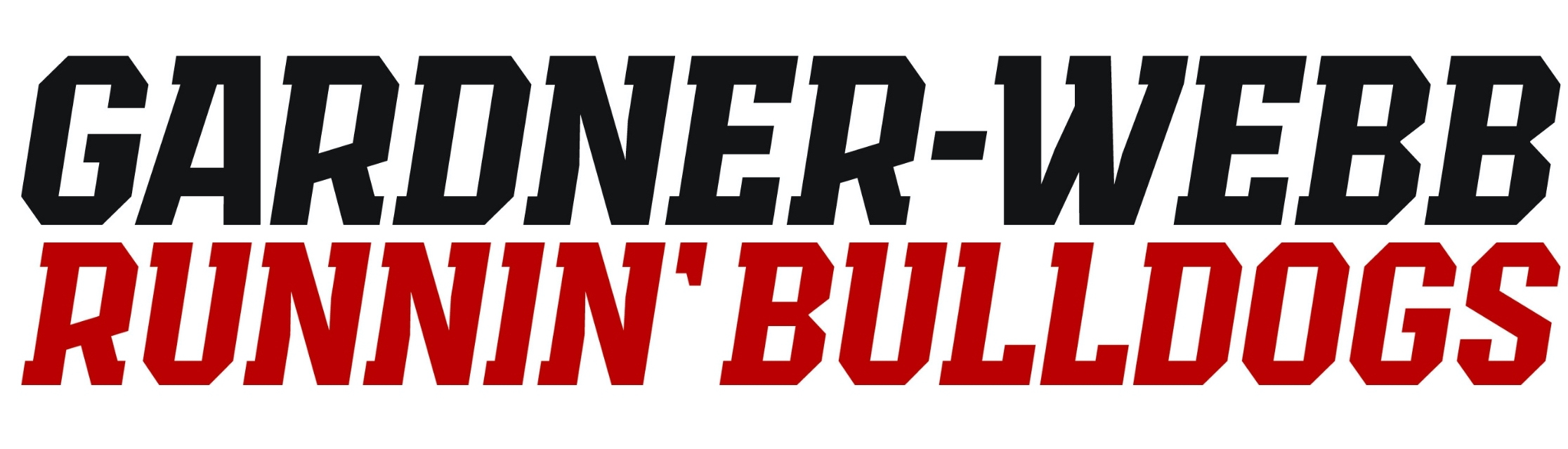
- Conference: Big South Conference
- Record: 4–29 (1–15 Big South)
- Head coach: Jeremy Luther (2nd season)
- Associate head coach: Jake DeLaney
- Assistant coaches: Adam Sweeney; Christian Turner; Mitch Hollis
- Home arena: Paul Porter Arena

2025–26 Big South men's basketball standings
	Conf.				Overall
Team	W		L	PCT	W		L	PCT
High Point	15	–	1	.938	27	–	4	.871
Winthrop	13	–	3	.813	21	–	10	.677
Radford	9	–	7	.563	16	–	15	.516
UNC Asheville	8	–	8	.500	14	–	16	.467
Longwood	8	–	8	.500	16	–	15	.516
Presbyterian	7	–	9	.438	14	–	17	.452
Charleston Southern	6	–	10	.375	15	–	16	.484
USC Upstate	5	–	11	.313	13	–	19	.406
Gardner–Webb	1	–	15	.063	4	–	28	.125
† 2026 Big South tournament winner As of March 4, 2026

The 2025–26 Gardner–Webb Runnin' Bulldogs men's basketball team represented Gardner–Webb University during the 2025–26 NCAA Division I men's basketball season. The Runnin' Bulldogs, led by second-year head coach Jeremy Luther, played their home games at Paul Porter Arena in Boiling Springs, North Carolina as members of the Big South Conference.

== Previous season ==
The Runnin' Bulldogs finished the 2024–25 season 11–20, 5–11 in Big South play, to finish in eighth place. They defeated USC Upstate in the first round of the Big South tournament, before falling to top-seeded and eventual tournament champions High Point in the quarterfinals.

== Preseason ==
On October 15, 2025, the Big South Conference released their preseason coaches poll. Gardner–Webb was picked to finish eighth in the conference.

=== Preseason rankings ===
Big South Preseason Poll
Place	Team	Points
1	High Point	80 (8)
2	UNC Asheville	68 (1)
3	Longwood	53
4	Radford	52
5	Winthrop	51
6	Presbyterian	37
7	Charleston Southern	27
8	Gardner–Webb	19
9	USC Upstate	18
(#) first-place votes

=== Preseason All-Big South Teams ===
No players were named to the First or Second Team All-Big South.

== Roster ==
2025–26 Gardner–Webb Runnin' Bulldogs men's basketball team
Players
Coaches

Pos.	#	Name	Height	Weight	Year	Previous school	Hometown
G	0	Jamias Ferere	6 ft 6 in (1.98 m)	210 lb (95 kg)	Fr	Putnam Science Academy	High Point, North Carolina
G	1	Spence Sims	6 ft 1 in (1.85 m)	180 lb (82 kg)	RS Fr	Alabama	Fairhope, Alabama
G	2	Isaiah Hicks	6 ft 0 in (1.83 m)	185 lb (84 kg)	RS Jr	Thomas Jefferson Classical Academy	Shelby, North Carolina
G	3	Julius Clark	6 ft 7 in (2.01 m)	200 lb (91 kg)	Jr	Tallahassee State College	Tuscaloosa, Alabama
G	4	DJ Jefferson	6 ft 4 in (1.93 m)	220 lb (100 kg)	RS Jr	Longwood	Richardson, Texas
F	5	Jacob Hogarth	6 ft 9 in (2.06 m)	210 lb (95 kg)	So	Iona	Brooklyn, New York
G	6	Jacob Hudson	6 ft 2 in (1.88 m)	185 lb (84 kg)	So	The Phelps School	Houston, Texas
F	7	Riek Riek	6 ft 9 in (2.06 m)	210 lb (95 kg)	GS	Drury	Rochester, Minnesota
G	8	Ashton King	6 ft 3 in (1.91 m)	195 lb (88 kg)	Fr	Millbrook High School	Raleigh, North Carolina
G	9	Paul Lindberg	6 ft 4 in (1.93 m)	195 lb (88 kg)	Jr	Lutheran South Academy	Houston, Texas
G/F	10	Curtis Williams III	6 ft 7 in (2.01 m)	190 lb (86 kg)	Jr	Northwest Florida State College	Rancho Cucamonga, California
F	11	Navuan Peterson	6 ft 6 in (1.98 m)	205 lb (93 kg)	GS	Trevecca Nazarene	Orlando, Florida
G	12	Cameron Gales	6 ft 0 in (1.83 m)	170 lb (77 kg)	So	Thomas Jefferson Classical Academy	Shelby, North Carolina
G	21	Ahmadou Ndiaye	6 ft 8 in (2.03 m)	225 lb (102 kg)	Jr	Southwest Mississippi Community College	Everett, Massachusetts
G	23	Colin Hawkins	6 ft 3 in (1.91 m)	225 lb (102 kg)	So	Sunrise Christian Academy	Colorado Springs, Colorado
G	25	Ace Talbert	6 ft 0 in (1.83 m)	185 lb (84 kg)	Jr	Saint Francis (PA)	Wyandanch, New York

Head coach

- Jeremy Luther (North Greenville)

Assistant coach(es)

- Jake DeLaney (Gardner–Webb)
- Adam Sweeney (Gardner–Webb)
- Christian Turner (Gardner–Webb)
- Mitch Hollis (Covenant)

Legend

- (C) Team captain
- (S) Suspended
- (I) Ineligible
- (W) Walk-on
- Injured
- Current redshirt

Roster
Last update: October 20, 2025

== Schedule and results ==
Date time, TV	Rank^{#}	Opponent^{#}	Result	Record	Site (attendance) city, state
Non-conference regular season
November 3, 2025*; 8:00 pm, B1G+		at Minnesota	L 60–87	0–1	Williams Arena (7,669); Minneapolis, MN
November 7, 2025*; 7:00 pm, ACCN		at Clemson	L 59–97	0–2	Littlejohn Coliseum (7,217); Clemson, SC
November 10, 2025*; 7:00 pm, ESPN+		North Greenville	L 81–92	0–3	Paul Porter Arena (578); Boiling Springs, NC
November 15, 2025*; 8:00 pm, FloCollege		at Elon	L 84–95	0–4	Schar Center (1,467); Elon, NC
November 18, 2025*; 7:00 pm, ESPN+		at DePaul	L 62–93	0–5	Wintrust Arena (2,762); Chicago, IL
November 22, 2025*; 7:00 pm, ESPN+		at Richmond	L 67–102	0–6	Robins Center (4,176); Richmond, VA
November 26, 2025*; 4:00 pm, FloCollege		vs. Navy; Live Oak Bank Holiday Classic	L 51–84	0–7	Trask Coliseum; Wilmington, NC
November 28, 2025*; 12:00 pm, FloCollege		vs. Southeastern Louisiana; Live Oak Bank Holiday Classic	L 68–76	0–8	Trask Coliseum; Wilmington, NC
November 29, 2025*; 3:00 pm, FloCollege		at UNC Wilmington; Live Oak Bank Holiday Classic	L 62–88	0–9	Trask Coliseum (4,119); Wilmington, NC
December 3, 2025*; 7:00 pm, WCCB		at Queens (NC)	L 74–107	0–10	Curry Arena (672); Charlotte, NC
December 6, 2025*; 2:00 pm, ESPN+		Georgia Southern	L 84–88	0–11	Paul Porter Arena (247); Boiling Springs, NC
December 12, 2025*; 7:00 pm, ESPN+		Brevard	W 77–63	1–11	Paul Porter Arena (789); Boiling Springs, NC
December 15, 2025*; 7:00 pm, ESPN+		Wofford	L 57–83	1–12	Paul Porter Arena (567); Boiling Springs, NC
December 18, 2025*; 7:00 pm, ESPN+		Toccoa Falls	W 105–65	2–12	Paul Porter Arena (2,000); Boiling Springs, NC
December 21, 2025*; 3:00 pm, SECN+		at No. 20 Tennessee	L 52–94	2–13	Thompson–Boling Arena (19,059); Knoxville, TN
Big South regular season
December 31, 2025; 2:00 pm, ESPN+		Charleston Southern	L 79–89	2–14 (0–1)	Paul Porter Arena (420); Boiling Springs, NC
January 3, 2026; 4:00 pm, ESPN+		at Winthrop	L 77–88	2–15 (0–2)	Winthrop Coliseum (1,234); Rock Hill, SC
January 7, 2026; 7:00 pm, ESPN+		at High Point	L 49–104	2–16 (0–3)	Qubein Center (3,414); High Point, NC
January 14, 2026; 7:00 pm, ESPN+		Radford	L 80–89	2–17 (0–4)	Paul Porter Arena (765); Boiling Springs, NC
January 17, 2026; 2:00 pm, ESPN+		Presbyterian	L 55–92	2–18 (0–5)	Paul Porter Arena (458); Boiling Springs, NC
January 21, 2026; 7:00 pm, ESPN+		at Longwood	L 56–91	2–19 (0–6)	Joan Perry Brock Center (1,315); Farmville, VA
January 24, 2026; 2:00 pm, ESPN+		USC Upstate	W 67–65	3–19 (1–6)	Paul Porter Arena (435); Boiling Springs, NC
January 29, 2026; 6:30 pm, ESPN+		at UNC Asheville	L 50–69	3–20 (1–7)	Kimmel Arena (1,016); Asheville, NC
February 4, 2026; 7:00 pm, ESPN+		Longwood	L 66–86	3–21 (1–8)	Paul Porter Arena (430); Boiling Springs, NC
February 7, 2026; 2:00 pm, ESPN+		at Presbyterian	L 62–68	3–22 (1–9)	Templeton Center (308); Clinton, SC
February 12, 2026; 7:00 pm, ESPN+		Winthrop	L 85–103	3–23 (1–10)	Paul Porter Arena (355); Boiling Springs, NC
February 14, 2026; 2:00 pm, ESPN+		High Point	L 87–112	3–24 (1–11)	Paul Porter Arena (435); Boiling Springs, NC
February 17, 2026; 6:00 pm, ESPN+		at Charleston Southern	L 66–75	3–25 (1–12)	Buccaneer Field House (602); North Charleston, SC
February 19, 2026; 7:00 pm, ESPN+		at Radford	L 70–82	3–26 (1–13)	Dedmon Center (953); Radford, VA
February 26, 2026; 7:00 pm, ESPN+		UNC Asheville	L 71–77	3–27 (1–14)	Paul Porter Arena (458); Boiling Springs, NC
February 28, 2026; 2:00 pm, ESPN+		at USC Upstate	L 61–71	3–28 (1–15)	G. B. Hodge Center; Spartanburg, SC
Big South tournament
March 4, 2026; 7:30 p.m., ESPN+	(9)	vs. (8) USC Upstate; First round	W 65–64	4–28	Freedom Hall Civic Center (1,218); Johnson City, TN
March 6, 2026; 12:00 p.m., ESPN+	(9)	vs. (1) High Point; Quarterfinals	L 59–81	4–29	Freedom Hall Civic Center; Johnson City, TN
*Non-conference game. ^{#}Rankings from AP Poll. (#) Tournament seedings in parentheses. All times are in Eastern.
