= 2025–26 USC Upstate Spartans men's basketball team =

American college basketball season

2025–26 USC Upstate Spartans men's basketball
- Conference: Big South Conference
- Record: 13–19 (5–11 Big South)
- Head coach: Marty Richter (2nd season)
- Assistant coaches: Cavel Witter; Nashad Mackey; Vince Fritz; Jon D'Angelo
- Home arena: G. B. Hodge Center

2025–26 Big South men's basketball standings
	Conf.				Overall
Team	W		L	PCT	W		L	PCT
High Point	15	–	1	.938	27	–	4	.871
Winthrop	13	–	3	.813	21	–	10	.677
Radford	9	–	7	.563	16	–	15	.516
UNC Asheville	8	–	8	.500	14	–	16	.467
Longwood	8	–	8	.500	16	–	15	.516
Presbyterian	7	–	9	.438	14	–	17	.452
Charleston Southern	6	–	10	.375	15	–	16	.484
USC Upstate	5	–	11	.313	13	–	18	.419
Gardner–Webb	1	–	15	.063	3	–	28	.097
† 2026 Big South tournament winner As of February 28, 2026

The 2025–26 USC Upstate Spartans men's basketball team represented the University of South Carolina Upstate during the 2025–26 NCAA Division I men's basketball season. The Spartans, led by second-year head coach Marty Richter, played their home games at the G. B. Hodge Center in Spartanburg, South Carolina as members of the Big South Conference.

== Previous season ==
The Spartans finished the 2024–25 season 6–26, 2–14 in Big South play, to finish in last place. They were defeated by Gardner–Webb in the first round of the Big South tournament.

== Preseason ==
On October 15, 2025, the Big South Conference released their preseason coaches poll. USC Upstate was picked to finish last in the conference.

=== Preseason rankings ===
Big South Preseason Poll
Place	Team	Points
1	High Point	80 (8)
2	UNC Asheville	68 (1)
3	Longwood	53
4	Radford	52
5	Winthrop	51
6	Presbyterian	37
7	Charleston Southern	27
8	Gardner–Webb	19
9	USC Upstate	18
(#) first-place votes

=== Preseason All-Big South Teams ===
Preseason All-Big South Second Team
Player	Year	Position
Karmani Gregory	RS Junior	Guard

== Roster ==
2025–26 USC Upstate Spartans men's basketball team
Players
Coaches

Pos.	#	Name	Height	Weight	Year	Previous school	Hometown
G	0	Tyler Smith	6 ft 0 in (1.83 m)	152 lb (69 kg)	Jr	Trinity Valley Community College	Chicago, Illinois
G	1	Karmani Gregory	6 ft 1 in (1.85 m)	175 lb (79 kg)	RS Jr	Florida SouthWestern	Palmetto, Florida
G	2	Isaiah Skinner	6 ft 5 in (1.96 m)	191 lb (87 kg)	RS Sr	Mt. San Jacinto College	Hemet, California
G	4	Carmelo Adkins	6 ft 4 in (1.93 m)	185 lb (84 kg)	So	PHHoenix Prep	Lubbock, Texas
G	5	TJ Lewis	6 ft 4 in (1.93 m)	184 lb (83 kg)	Fr	Blythewood High School	Blythewood, South Carolina
G	6	Kanye Jones	6 ft 5 in (1.96 m)	186 lb (84 kg)	RS Jr	Buffalo	Orlando, Florida
C	7	Coen Collier	7 ft 1 in (2.16 m)	226 lb (103 kg)	Jr	Salt Lake Community College	Holladay, Utah
F	8	Nic Book	6 ft 8 in (2.03 m)	216 lb (98 kg)	So	Westfield High School	Christchurch, New Zealand
G	9	Mason Bendinger	6 ft 4 in (1.93 m)	210 lb (95 kg)	Jr	Salt Lake Community College	Salt Lake City, Utah
F	10	Breylin Garcia	6 ft 6 in (1.98 m)	217 lb (98 kg)	Sr	Daytona State	La Romana, Dominican Republic
G/F	11	Learic Davis	6 ft 6 in (1.98 m)	195 lb (88 kg)	RS Jr	Milwaukee	Milwaukee, Wisconsin
F	12	Jafeth Martinez	6 ft 9 in (2.06 m)	238 lb (108 kg)	Jr	Florida SouthWestern	Roatán, Honduras
G	21	CJ Rich	5 ft 9 in (1.75 m)	174 lb (79 kg)	Jr	Spring Valley High School	Columbia, South Carolina
G	24	Chico Johnson	6 ft 2 in (1.88 m)	175 lb (79 kg)	RS So	Drake	Toledo, Ohio

Head coach

- Marty Richter (Simpson)

Assistant coach(es)

- Cavel Witter (Creighton)
- Nashad Mackey (Embry–Riddle)
- Vince Fritz (Missouri Southern)
- Jon D'Angelo (Virginia)

Legend

- (C) Team captain
- (S) Suspended
- (I) Ineligible
- (W) Walk-on
- Injured
- Current redshirt

Roster
Last update: October 22, 2025

== Schedule and results ==
Date time, TV	Rank^{#}	Opponent^{#}	Result	Record	High points	High rebounds	High assists	Site (attendance) city, state
Non-conference regular season
November 3, 2025*; 10:30 pm, ESPN+		at California Baptist	L 75–87	0–1	24 – Gregory	6 – Adkins	3 – Gregory	Fowler Events Center (4,386); Riverside, CA
November 5, 2025*; 9:00 pm, MW Network		at Fresno State	W 67–66	1–1	15 – Gregory	10 – Martinez	3 – Smith	Save Mart Center (2,722); Fresno, CA
November 8, 2025*; 12:00 pm, ESPN+		Southern Virginia	W 105-46	2–1	23 – Adkins	9 – Garcia	6 – Skinner	G. B. Hodge Center (302); Spartanburg, SC
November 12, 2025*; 7:00 pm, ESPN+		Bob Jones	W 114–53	3–1	17 – Adkins	12 – Skinner	5 – Skinner	G. B. Hodge Center (373); Spartanburg, SC
November 15, 2025*; 7:00 pm, FloCollege		at UNC Wilmington	L 60–73	3–2	15 – Gregory	8 – Davis	3 – Skinner	Trask Coliseum (5,220); Wilmington, NC
November 19, 2025*; 7:00 pm, ESPN+		Tennessee Tech	L 84–88	3–3	22 – Adkins	6 – Davis	8 – Smith	G. B. Hodge Center (471); Spartanburg, SC
November 21, 2025*; 7:00 pm, ESPN+		at West Georgia	L 64–72	3–4	21 – Bendinger	12 – Martinez	5 – Smith	The Coliseum (522); Carrollton, GA
November 25, 2025*; 7:00 pm, ESPN+		North Carolina Central	W 82–67	4–4	19 – Bendinger	5 – Martinez	5 – Gregory	G. B. Hodge Center (357); Spartanburg, SC
November 29, 2025*; 2:00 pm, B1G+		at Nebraska	L 63–72	4–5	20 – Gregory	9 – Adkins	4 – Gregory	Pinnacle Bank Arena (14,107); Lincoln, NE
December 3, 2025*; 7:00 pm, ESPN+		Coastal Carolina	W 85–78 ^{OT}	5–5	27 – Bendinger	9 – Davis	3 – Gregory	G. B. Hodge Center (717); Spartanburg, SC
December 6, 2025*; 2:00 pm, ESPN+		Western Carolina	W 78–67	6–5	15 – Bendinger	9 – Davis	6 – Gregory	G. B. Hodge Center (419); Spartanburg, SC
December 13, 2025*; 2:00 pm, The CW		at No. 14 North Carolina	L 62–80	6–6	14 – Davis	9 – Martinez	6 – Smith	Dean Smith Center (17,759); Chapel Hill, NC
December 16, 2025*; 6:00 pm		at South Carolina State	W 78–72	7–6	19 – Bendinger	9 – Davis	4 – Gregory	SHM Memorial Center (185); Orangeburg, SC
December 17, 2025*; 7:00 pm, ESPN+		Southern Wesleyan	W 98–63	8–6	17 – Skinner	8 – Collier	6 – Skinner	G. B. Hodge Center (239); Spartanburg, SC
December 20, 2025*; 1:00 pm, ESPN+		at Youngstown State	L 65–74	8–7	26 – Gregory	8 – Smith	3 – Smith	Beeghly Center (3,041); Youngstown, OH
Big South regular season
December 31, 2025; 7:00 pm, ESPN+		Radford	L 69–76	8–8 (0–1)	16 – Adkins	8 – Adkins	3 – Bendinger	G. B. Hodge Center; Spartanburg, SC
January 3, 2026; 2:00 pm, ESPN+		at Presbyterian	L 77–86	8–9 (0–2)	18 – Davis	5 – Garcia	4 – Gregory	Templeton Center (415); Clinton, SC
January 10, 2026; 2:00 pm, ESPN+		Winthrop	L 50–71	8–10 (0–3)	16 – Garcia	6 – Garcia	3 – Skinner	G. B. Hodge Center (404); Spartanburg, SC
January 14, 2026; 7:00 pm, ESPN+		at Charleston Southern	W 86–81	9–10 (1–3)	22 – Davis	9 – Adkins	3 – Smith	Buccaneer Field House (589); North Charleston, SC
January 17, 2026; 7:00 pm, ESPN+		at High Point	L 69–89	9–11 (1–4)	17 – Davis	11 – Martinez	3 – Adkins	Qubein Center (4,790); High Point, NC
January 21, 2026; 7:00 pm, ESPN+		UNC Asheville	L 69–83	9–12 (1–5)	28 – Bendinger	5 – Garcia	3 – Skinner	G. B. Hodge Center (441); Spartanburg, SC
January 24, 2026; 2:00 pm, ESPN+		at Gardner–Webb	L 65–67	9–13 (1–6)	22 – Gregory	6 – Davis	2 – Gregory	Paul Porter Arena (435); Boiling Springs, NC
January 29, 2026; 7:00 pm, ESPN+		Longwood	W 65–60	10–13 (2–6)	19 – Gregory	10 – Adkins	5 – Gregory	G. B. Hodge Center (703); Spartanburg, SC
February 4, 2026; 6:30 pm, ESPN+		at UNC Asheville	L 67–76	10–14 (2–7)	22 – Gregory	5 – Gregory	4 – Bendinger	Kimmel Arena (876); Asheville, NC
February 7, 2026; 2:00 pm, ESPN+		Charleston Southern	W 100–94 ^{OT}	11–14 (3–7)	29 – Gregory	7 – Collier	7 – Gregory	G. B. Hodge Center (320); Spartanburg, SC
February 12, 2026; 7:00 pm, ESPN+		High Point	L 70–95	11–15 (3–8)	15 – Bendinger	12 – Martinez	4 – Adkins	G. B. Hodge Center (375); Spartanburg, SC
February 14, 2026; 3:00 pm, ESPN+		at Longwood	L 75–82 ^{OT}	11–16 (3–9)	23 – Gregory	9 – Bendinger	6 – Adkins	Joan Perry Brock Center (2,173); Farmville, VA
February 19, 2026; 6:30 pm, ESPN+		at Winthrop	L 64–68	11–17 (3–10)	21 – Adkins	7 – Garcia	2 – Tied	Winthrop Coliseum (1,932); Rock Hill, SC
February 21, 2026; 4:30 pm, ESPN+		Presbyerian	W 76–74	12–17 (4–10)	20 – Gregory	9 – Collier	3 – Tied	G. B. Hodge Center (419); Spartanburg, SC
February 26, 2026; 7:00 pm, ESPN+		at Radford	L 59–71	12–18 (4–11)	15 – Adkins	9 – Martinez	7 – Adkins	Dedmon Center (971); Radford, VA
February 28, 2026; 2:00 pm, ESPN+		Gardner–Webb	W 71–61	13–18 (5–11)	22 – Gregory	9 – Garcia	5 – Gregory	G. B. Hodge Center; Spartanburg, SC
Big South tournament
March 4, 2026; 7:30 pm, ESPN+	(8)	vs. (9) Gardner–Webb; First round	L 64–65	13–19	18 – Skinner	5 – Tied	5 – Smith	Freedom Hall Civic Center (1,218); Johnson City, TN
*Non-conference game. ^{#}Rankings from AP Poll. (#) Tournament seedings in parentheses. All times are in Eastern.
