= 2025–26 Charleston Southern Buccaneers men's basketball team =

American college basketball season

2025–26 Charleston Southern Buccaneers men's basketball
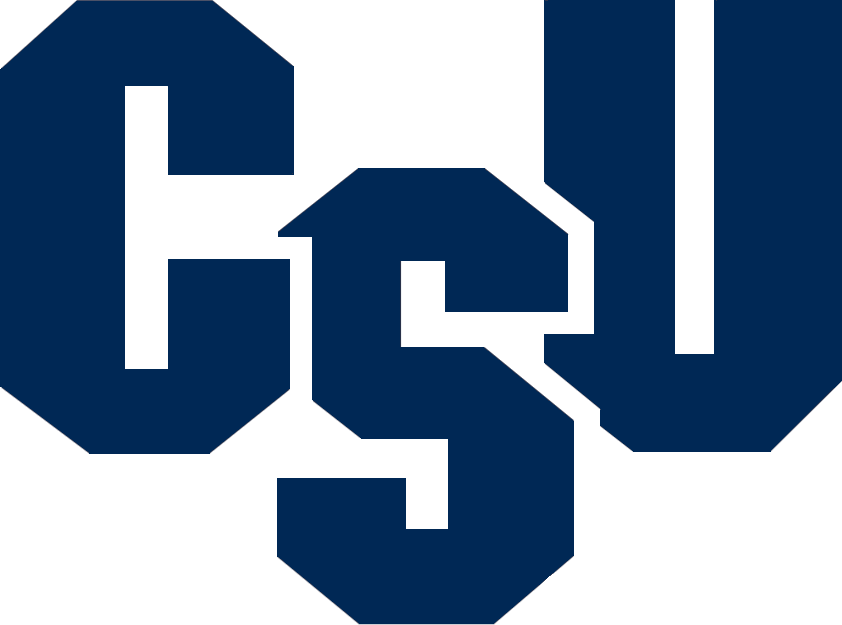
- Conference: Big South Conference
- Record: 15–17 (6–10 Big South)
- Head coach: Saah Nimley (2nd full, 3rd overall season)
- Associate head coach: Mike Howland
- Assistant coaches: Trey Johnson; Nate Louis; Michael Ervin
- Home arena: Buccaneer Field House

2025–26 Big South men's basketball standings
	Conf.				Overall
Team	W		L	PCT	W		L	PCT
High Point	15	–	1	.938	27	–	4	.871
Winthrop	13	–	3	.813	21	–	10	.677
Radford	9	–	7	.563	16	–	15	.516
UNC Asheville	8	–	8	.500	14	–	16	.467
Longwood	8	–	8	.500	16	–	15	.516
Presbyterian	7	–	9	.438	14	–	17	.452
Charleston Southern	6	–	10	.375	15	–	16	.484
USC Upstate	5	–	11	.313	13	–	19	.406
Gardner–Webb	1	–	15	.063	4	–	28	.125
† 2026 Big South tournament winner As of March 4, 2026

The 2025–26 Charleston Southern Buccaneers men's basketball team represented Charleston Southern University during the 2025–26 NCAA Division I men's basketball season. The Buccaneers, led by second-year head coach Saah Nimley, played their home games at the Buccaneer Field House in North Charleston, South Carolina as members of the Big South Conference.

== Previous season ==
The Buccaneers finished the 2024–25 season 10–22, 6–10 in Big South play, to finish in seventh place. They were defeated by UNC Asheville in the quarterfinals of the Big South tournament.

== Preseason ==
On October 15, 2025, the Big South Conference released their preseason coaches poll. Charleston Southern was picked to finish seventh in the conference.

=== Preseason rankings ===
Big South Preseason Poll
Place	Team	Points
1	High Point	80 (8)
2	UNC Asheville	68 (1)
3	Longwood	53
4	Radford	52
5	Winthrop	51
6	Presbyterian	37
7	Charleston Southern	27
8	Gardner–Webb	19
9	USC Upstate	18
(#) first-place votes

=== Preseason All-Big South Teams ===
Preseason All-Big South Second Team
Player	Year	Position
A'lahn Sumler	RS Junior	Guard

== Roster ==
2025–26 Charleston Southern Buccaneers men's basketball team
Players
Coaches

Pos.	#	Name	Height	Weight	Year	Previous school	Hometown
G	0	Armari Carraway	6 ft 0 in (1.83 m)	170 lb (77 kg)	Jr	Eastern Arizona	Fresno, California
G	1	A'lahn Sumler	6 ft 4 in (1.93 m)	200 lb (91 kg)	RS Jr	Northern Kentucky	Waterbury, Connecticut
G	2	Jaquias Franklin (5th)	6 ft 1 in (1.85 m)	180 lb (82 kg)	Sr	Georgetown College	Elizabethtown, Kentucky
F	4	Trent Coleman	6 ft 7 in (2.01 m)	210 lb (95 kg)	GS	Auburn Montgomery	Ridgeland, Mississippi
G	5	Jacob Taylor	6 ft 3 in (1.91 m)	185 lb (84 kg)	Fr	Wheeler High School	Marietta, Georgia
G	6	Anthony Gause	6 ft 3 in (1.91 m)	180 lb (82 kg)	So	Milton High School	St. Louis, Missouri
F	7	Nate Brafford	6 ft 9 in (2.06 m)	200 lb (91 kg)	Sr	Georgia Southern	Waynesville, North Carolina
G	8	Luke Williams	6 ft 0 in (1.83 m)	180 lb (82 kg)	GS	Maryville	Olathe, Kansas
G	10	AJ Gladieux	6 ft 2 in (1.88 m)	170 lb (77 kg)	Fr	Grace Christian School	Holly Springs, North Carolina
G	11	Brycen Blaine	6 ft 5 in (1.96 m)	205 lb (93 kg)	RS Jr	Gulf Coast State	Richmond, Virginia
F	12	Jesse Hafemeister	6 ft 5 in (1.96 m)	200 lb (91 kg)	GS	Mercyhurst	Mendham, New Jersey
G	13	Kaleb Lofton	6 ft 0 in (1.83 m)	175 lb (79 kg)	Jr	Covenant College	Savannah, Georgia
F	22	Devin Brafford	7 ft 1 in (2.16 m)	200 lb (91 kg)	So	Siena	Waynesville, North Carolina
F	23	Reis Jones	6 ft 10 in (2.08 m)	240 lb (109 kg)	Sr	Florida SouthWestern	Fort Washington, Maryland
G	24	Easton Hupp	6 ft 4 in (1.93 m)	200 lb (91 kg)	Fr	Liberty Christian School	Fort Worth, Texas
F	34	Lase Olalere	6 ft 11 in (2.11 m)	235 lb (107 kg)	RS So	Charleston Charter Math & Science	Charleston, South Carolina

Head coach

- Saah Nimley (Charleston Southern)

Assistant coach(es)

- Mike Howland (DePauw)
- Trey Johnson (Charleston Southern)
- Nate Louis (Charleston Southern)
- Michael Ervin (Appalachian State)

Legend

- (C) Team captain
- (S) Suspended
- (I) Ineligible
- (W) Walk-on
- (5th) Fifth-year senior
- Injured
- Current redshirt

Roster
Last update: October 19, 2025

== Schedule and results ==
Date time, TV	Rank^{#}	Opponent^{#}	Result	Record	Site (attendance) city, state
Non-conference regular season
November 3, 2025*; 7:00 pm, ACCNX		at Virginia Tech	L 67–98	0–1	Cassell Coliseum (4,488); Blacksburg, VA
November 6, 2025*; 7:00 pm, ESPN+		Toccoa Falls	W 106–71	1–1	Buccaneer Field House (802); North Charleston, SC
November 10, 2025*; 7:00 pm, ESPN+		at The Citadel	W 96–86	2–1	McAlister Field House (1,719); Charleston, SC
November 13, 2025*; 8:00 pm		at Alabama A&M; Bulldog Bash	L 64–68	2–2	AAMU Event Center (1,833); Huntsville, AL
November 14, 2025*; 6:30 pm		vs. Lindenwood; Bulldog Bash	L 77–83	2–3	AAMU Event Center (190); Huntsville, AL
November 18, 2025*; 7:00 pm, ESPN+		IU Indy	W 103–91	3–3	Buccaneer Field House (875); North Charleston, SC
November 21, 2025*; 7:00 pm, ESPN+		at East Carolina	W 77–65	4–3	Williams Arena (3,327); Greenville, NC
November 25, 2025*; 7:30 pm, ESPN+		Piedmont	W 93–81	5–3	Buccaneer Field House (803); North Charleston, SC
November 28, 2025*; 4:00 pm, SECN+		at South Carolina	L 62–74	5–4	Colonial Life Arena (9,789); Columbia, SC
December 2, 2025*; 11:00 am, ESPN+		at UT Martin	L 56–73	5–5	Skyhawk Arena (4,513); Martin, TN
December 4, 2025*; 7:00 pm, ESPN+		Warren Wilson	W 124–63	6–5	Buccaneer Field House (501); North Charleston, SC
December 8, 2025*; 7:00 pm, ESPN+		South Carolina State	W 84–44	7–5	Buccaneer Field House (854); North Charleston, SC
December 18, 2025*; 11:00 am, ESPN+		North Florida	W 113–90	8–5	Buccaneer Field House (903); North Charleston, SC
December 21, 2025*; 2:00 pm, ESPN+		at Furman	L 76–84	8–6	Timmons Arena (1,867); Greenville, SC
December 28, 2025*; 4:00 pm, ESPN+		at Richmond	W 77–72	9–6	Robins Center (4,888); Richmond, VA
Big South regular season
December 31, 2025; 2:00 pm, ESPN+		at Gardner–Webb	W 89–79	10–6 (1–0)	Paul Porter Arena (420); Boiling Springs, NC
January 3, 2026; 2:00 pm, ESPN+		UNC Asheville	W 86–83	11–6 (2–0)	Buccaneer Field House (703); North Charleston, SC
January 7, 2026; 6:30 pm, ESPN+		at Winthrop	L 77–81	11–7 (2–1)	Winthrop Coliseum (1,057); Rock Hill, SC
January 10, 2026; 2:00 pm, ESPN+		High Point	L 82–84 ^{OT}	11–8 (2–2)	Buccaneer Field House (780); North Charleston, SC
January 14, 2026; 7:00 pm, ESPN+		USC Upstate	L 81–86	11–9 (2–3)	Buccaneer Field House (589); North Charleston, SC
January 21, 2026; 7:00 pm, ESPN+		at Presbyterian	L 83–87	11–10 (2–4)	Templeton Center (918); Clinton, SC
January 24, 2026; 4:00 pm, ESPN+		at Longwood	L 79–81 ^{OT}	11–11 (2–5)	Joan Perry Brock Center (1,123); Farmville, VA
January 29, 2026; 7:00 pm, ESPN+		Radford	L 75-84	11-12 (2-6)	Buccaneer Field House (812); North Charleston, SC
February 4, 2026; 7:00 pm, ESPN+		at High Point	L 55-80	11-13 (2-7)	Qubein Center (3,356); High Point, NC
February 7, 2026; 2:00 pm, ESPN+		at USC Upstate	L 94-100 ^{OT}	11-14 (2-8)	G. B. Hodge Center (320); Spartanburg, SC
February 12, 2026; 7:00 pm, ESPN+		Presbyterian	W 84–67	12–14 (3–8)	Buccaneer Field House (747); North Charleston, SC
February 14, 2026; 2:30 pm, ESPN+		at Radford	L 80–90	12–15 (3–9)	Dedmon Center (1,363); Radford, VA
February 17, 2026; 6:00 pm, ESPN+		Gardner–Webb	W 75–66	13–15 (4–9)	Buccaneer Field House (602); North Charleston, SC
February 21, 2026; 4:00 pm, ESPN+		Longwood	L 96–107	13–16 (4–10)	Buccaneer Field House (803); North Charleston, SC
February 26, 2026; 7:00 pm, ESPN+		Winthrop	W 86–84	14–16 (5–10)	Buccaneer Field House (902); North Charleston, SC
February 28, 2026; 2:00 pm, ESPN+		at UNC Asheville	W 92–75	15–16 (6–10)	Kimmel Arena (1,808); Asheville, NC
Big South tournament
March 6, 2026; 2:30 pm, ESPN+	(7)	vs. (2) Winthrop; Quarterfinals	L 81–86	15–17	Freedom Hall Civic Center; Johnson City, TN
*Non-conference game. ^{#}Rankings from AP Poll. (#) Tournament seedings in parentheses. All times are in Eastern.
