= 2025–26 Presbyterian Blue Hose men's basketball team =

American college basketball season

2025–26 Presbyterian Blue Hose men's basketball
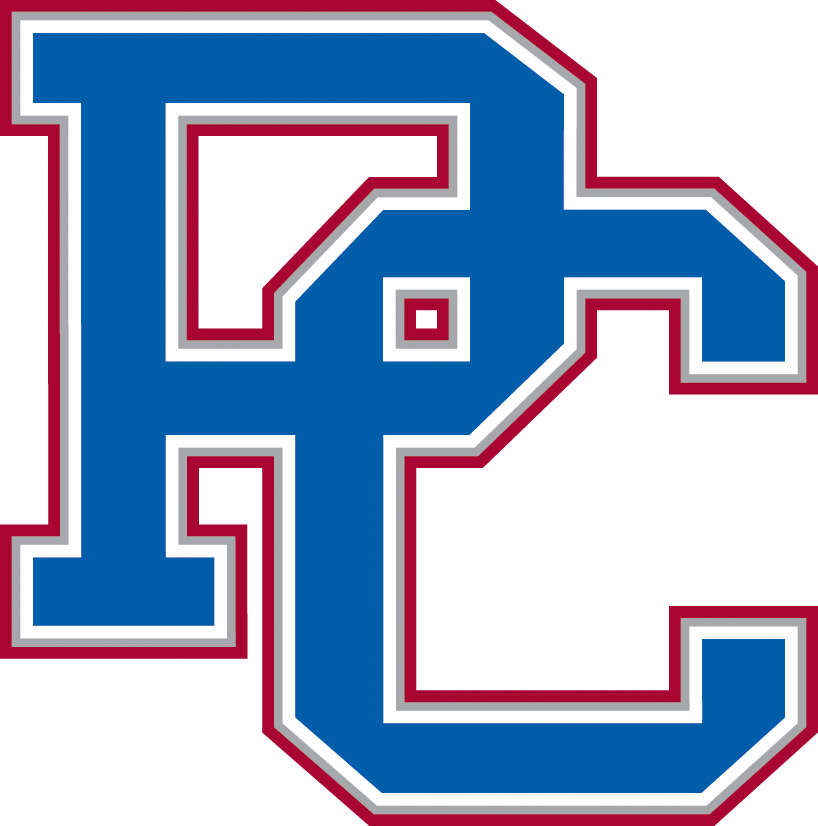
- Conference: Big South Conference
- Record: 15–18 (7–9 Big South)
- Head coach: Quinton Ferrell (7th season)
- Assistant coaches: Al'lonzo Coleman; Justin Griffith; Rob Lane
- Home arena: Templeton Center

2025–26 Big South men's basketball standings
	Conf.				Overall
Team	W		L	PCT	W		L	PCT
High Point	15	–	1	.938	29	–	4	.879
Winthrop	13	–	3	.813	23	–	10	.697
Radford	9	–	7	.563	16	–	16	.500
UNC Asheville	8	–	8	.500	15	–	17	.469
Longwood	8	–	8	.500	16	–	16	.500
Presbyterian	7	–	9	.438	15	–	18	.455
Charleston Southern	6	–	10	.375	15	–	17	.469
USC Upstate	5	–	11	.313	13	–	19	.406
Gardner–Webb	1	–	15	.063	4	–	29	.121
† 2026 Big South tournament winner As of March 7, 2026

The 2025–26 Presbyterian Blue Hose men's basketball team represented Presbyterian College during the 2025–26 NCAA Division I men's basketball season. The Blue Hose, led by seventh-year head coach Quinton Ferrell, played their home games at the Templeton Center in Clinton, South Carolina as members of the Big South Conference.

== Previous season ==
The Blue Hose finished the 2024–25 season 14–19, 7–9 in Big South play, to finish in a tie for fifth place. They were defeated by Radford in the quarterfinals of the Big South tournament. They received an invitation to the CBI, where they would be defeated by eventual tournament champions Illinois State in the first round.

== Preseason ==
On October 15, 2025, the Big South Conference released their preseason coaches poll. Presbyterian was picked to finish sixth in the conference.

=== Preseason rankings ===
Big South Preseason Poll
Place	Team	Points
1	High Point	80 (8)
2	UNC Asheville	68 (1)
3	Longwood	53
4	Radford	52
5	Winthrop	51
6	Presbyterian	37
7	Charleston Southern	27
8	Gardner–Webb	19
9	USC Upstate	18
(#) first-place votes

=== Preseason All-Big South Teams ===
Preseason All-Big South Second Team
Player	Year	Position
Jonah Pierce	RS Senior	Forward

== Roster ==
2025–26 Presbyterian Blue Hose men's basketball team
Players
Coaches

Pos.	#	Name	Height	Weight	Year	Previous school	Hometown
G	0	Iverson King	6 ft 6 in (1.98 m)	205 lb (93 kg)	So	Forsyth Country Day School	Winston-Salem, North Carolina
G	1	Luke Allison	6 ft 0 in (1.83 m)	170 lb (77 kg)	So	Sentinel High School	Missoula, Montana
G	2	Khalon Hudson	6 ft 6 in (1.98 m)	215 lb (98 kg)	RS So	Spartanburg Methodist College	Augusta, Georgia
G	3	JD Bowden	6 ft 1 in (1.85 m)	180 lb (82 kg)	Fr	Ambassador Christian School	Charlotte, North Carolina
G/F	4	Josh Pickett	6 ft 5 in (1.96 m)	210 lb (95 kg)	So	Denver	Plainfield, Illinois
F	6	Chidi Chiakwelu	6 ft 8 in (2.03 m)	205 lb (93 kg)	RS Fr	George Ranch High School	Houston, Texas
G	7	Triston Wilson	6 ft 6 in (1.98 m)	205 lb (93 kg)	So	Miami Norland Senior High School	Miami, Florida
G	10	Amare Anderson	6 ft 1 in (1.85 m)	180 lb (82 kg)	Fr	Greer High School	Greer, South Carolina
G	11	Erik Taylor	6 ft 1 in (1.85 m)	180 lb (82 kg)	So	Sam Houston	Orlando, Florida
G	12	Carl Parrish	6 ft 3 in (1.91 m)	170 lb (77 kg)	Jr	Miami Norland Senior High School	Miami Gardens, Florida
F	13	Augustine Ayelyine	6 ft 10 in (2.08 m)	210 lb (95 kg)	Fr	University Christian School	Sunyani, Ghana
F	15	Jonah Pierce	6 ft 10 in (2.08 m)	235 lb (107 kg)	RS Sr	Francis Marion	Sanford, Florida
F	42	Jaylen Peterson	6 ft 8 in (2.03 m)	200 lb (91 kg)	RS Jr	Greenforest-McCalep Christian Academy	Stone Mountain, Georgia

Head coach

- Quinton Ferrell (Presbyterian)

Assistant coach(es)

- Al'lonzo Coleman (Presbyterian)
- Justin Griffith (North Carolina Wesleyan)
- Rob Lane (Pittsburgh)

Legend

- (C) Team captain
- (S) Suspended
- (I) Ineligible
- (W) Walk-on
- Injured
- Current redshirt

Roster
Last update: October 21, 2025

== Schedule and results ==
Date time, TV	Rank^{#}	Opponent^{#}	Result	Record	Site (attendance) city, state
Exhibition
October 17, 2025*; 6:00 pm		at Clemson	L 44–83	–	Littlejohn Coliseum (2,209); Clemson, SC
October 28, 2025*; 7:00 pm		SC Central Christian	W 115–43	–	Templeton Center (100); Clinton, SC
Non-conference regular season
November 3, 2025*; 7:00 pm, ESPN+		Navy	L 55–76	0–1	Templeton Center (471); Clinton, SC
November 5, 2025*; 6:00 pm, ESPN+		Bluefield	W 105–76	1–1	Templeton Center (353); Clinton, SC
November 8, 2025*; 6:00 pm, ESPN+		East Tennessee State	W 68–64	2–1	Templeton Center (279); Clinton, SC
November 10, 2025*; 7:00 pm, ESPN+		at Georgia State	W 63–61	3–1	GSU Convocation Center (12,62); Atlanta, GA
November 12, 2025*; 7:00 pm, SECN+		at South Carolina	L 61–81	3–2	Colonial Life Arena (11,874); Columbia, SC
November 16, 2025*; 4:00 pm, ESPN+		at Sacramento State; Empire Classic campus game	L 62–64	3–3	Hornets Nest (2,216); Sacramento, CA
November 18, 2025*; 10:00 pm, ACCNX		at California; Empire Classic campus game	L 57–67	3–4	Haas Pavilion (1,894); Berkeley, CA
November 21, 2025*; 10:30 pm, BTN		at No. 19 UCLA; Empire Classic campus game	L 46–86	3–5	Pauley Pavilion (4,142); Los Angeles, CA
November 26, 2025*; 1:00 pm, ESPN+		Columbia International	W 93–50	4–5	Templeton Center (236); Clinton, SC
November 30, 2025*; 4:00 pm, ESPN+		vs. The Citadel	W 69–41	5–5	Harrah's Cherokee Center (243); Asheville, NC
December 3, 2025*; 7:00 pm, ESPN+		at Wofford	L 56–63	5–6	Jerry Richardson Indoor Stadium (1,410); Spartanburg, SC
December 6, 2025*; 2:00 pm, ESPN+		Morehead State	W 80–72	6–6	Templeton Center (243); Clinton, SC
December 17, 2025*; 7:00 pm, ESPN+		at East Carolina	L 53–74	6–7	Williams Arena (2,663); Greenville, NC
December 21, 2025*; 2:00 pm, ESPN+		at Manhattan	L 81–87	6–8	Draddy Gymnasium (461); Riverdale, NY
December 28, 2025*; 4:00 pm, ESPN+		Truett McConnell	W 91–64	7–8	Templeton Center (252); Clinton, SC
Big South regular season
January 3, 2026; 2:00 pm, ESPN+		USC Upstate	W 86–77	8–8 (1–0)	Templeton Center (415); Clinton, SC
January 7, 2026; 7:00 pm, ESPN+		at Radford	L 61–80	8–9 (1–1)	Dedmon Center (878); Radford, VA
January 10, 2026; 3:00 pm, ESPN+		at Longwood	L 70–77	8–10 (1–2)	Joan Perry Brock Center (1,448); Farmville, VA
January 14, 2026; 7:00 pm, ESPN+		UNC Asheville	W 71–70	9–10 (2–2)	Templeton Center (523); Clinton, SC
January 17, 2026; 2:00 pm, ESPN+		at Gardner–Webb	W 92–55	10–10 (3–2)	Paul Porter Arena (458); Boiling Springs, NC
January 21, 2026; 7:00 pm, ESPN+		Charleston Southern	W 87–83	11–10 (4–2)	Templeton Center (918); Clinton, SC
January 24, 2026; 4:30 pm, ESPN+		Winthrop	L 72–82	11–11 (4–3)	Templeton Center (647); Clinton, SC
January 29, 2026; 9:00 pm, ESPNU		at High Point	L 81–84	11–12 (4–4)	Qubein Center (5,245); High Point, NC
January 31, 2026; 2:00 pm, ESPN+		Radford	L 84–93 ^{2OT}	11–13 (4–5)	Templeton Center (637); Clinton, SC
February 7, 2026; 2:00 pm, ESPN+		Gardner–Webb	W 68–62	12–13 (5–5)	Templeton Center (308); Clinton, SC
February 12, 2026; 7:00 pm, ESPN+		at Charleston Southern	L 67–84	12–14 (5–6)	Buccaneer Field House (747); North Charleston, SC
February 14, 2026; 2:00 pm, ESPN+		at UNC Asheville	W 58–57	13–14 (6–6)	Kimmel Arena (1,032); Asheville, NC
February 19, 2026; 7:00 pm, ESPN+		Longwood	W 72–65	14–14 (7–6)	Templeton Center (265); Clinton, SC
February 21, 2026; 5:00 pm, ESPN+		at USC Upstate	L 74–76	14–15 (7–7)	G. B. Hodge Center (419); Spartanburg, SC
February 26, 2026; 7:00 pm, ESPNU		High Point	L 73–79	14–16 (7–8)	Templeton Center (1,438); Clinton, SC
February 28, 2026; 4:00 pm, ESPN+		at Winthrop	L 70–74	14–17 (7–9)	Winthrop Coliseum (2,403); Rock Hill, SC
Big South tournament
March 6, 2026; 8:30 pm, ESPN+	(6)	vs. (3) Radford; Quarterfinals	W 91–85 ^{OT}	15–17	Freedom Hall Civic Center (1,418); Johnson City, TN
March 7, 2026; 2:30 pm, ESPN+	(6)	vs. (2) Winthrop; Semifinals	L 71–73	15–18	Freedom Hall Civic Center (1,927); Johnson City, TN
*Non-conference game. ^{#}Rankings from AP Poll. (#) Tournament seedings in parentheses. All times are in Eastern.
