= 2025–26 UNC Asheville Bulldogs men's basketball team =

American college basketball season

2025–26 UNC Asheville Bulldogs men's basketball
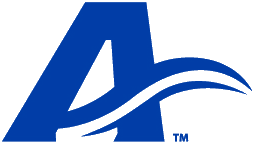
- Conference: Big South Conference
- Record: 15–17 (8–8 Big South)
- Head coach: Mike Morrell (8th season)
- Associate head coach: Woody Taylor
- Assistant coaches: Justin Levine; Andrew Garcia
- Home arena: Kimmel Arena

2025–26 Big South men's basketball standings
	Conf.				Overall
Team	W		L	PCT	W		L	PCT
High Point	15	–	1	.938	29	–	4	.879
Winthrop	13	–	3	.813	23	–	10	.697
Radford	9	–	7	.563	16	–	16	.500
UNC Asheville	8	–	8	.500	15	–	17	.469
Longwood	8	–	8	.500	16	–	16	.500
Presbyterian	7	–	9	.438	15	–	18	.455
Charleston Southern	6	–	10	.375	15	–	17	.469
USC Upstate	5	–	11	.313	13	–	19	.406
Gardner–Webb	1	–	15	.063	4	–	29	.121
† 2026 Big South tournament winner As of March 7, 2026

The 2025–26 UNC Asheville Bulldogs men's basketball team represented the University of North Carolina at Asheville during the 2025–26 NCAA Division I men's basketball season. The Bulldogs, led by eighth-year head coach Mike Morrell, played their home games at Kimmel Arena in Asheville, North Carolina, as members of the Big South Conference.

== Previous season ==
The Bulldogs finished the 2024–25 season 21–11, 11–5 in Big South play, to finish in a tie for second place. They defeated Charleston Southern in the quarterfinals of the Big South tournament, before falling to Winthrop in the semifinals.

== Preseason ==
On October 15, 2025, the Big South Conference released their preseason coaches poll. UNC Asheville was picked to finish second in the conference, while receiving one first-place vote.

=== Preseason rankings ===
Big South Preseason Poll
Place	Team	Points
1	High Point	80 (8)
2	UNC Asheville	68 (1)
3	Longwood	53
4	Radford	52
5	Winthrop	51
6	Presbyterian	37
7	Charleston Southern	27
8	Gardner–Webb	19
9	USC Upstate	18
(#) first-place votes

=== Big South Preseason Player of the Year ===
Big South Preseason Player of the Year
Player	Year	Position
Toyaz Solomon	Fifth Year	Forward

=== Preseason All-Big South Teams ===
Preseason All-Big South Teams
Team	Player	Year	Position
First	Toyaz Solomon	Ffith Year	Forward
Second	Kameron Taylor	Sophomore	Guard/Forward

== Roster ==
2025–26 UNC Asheville Bulldogs men's basketball team
Players
Coaches

Pos.	#	Name	Height	Weight	Year	Previous school	Hometown
F	0	Toyaz Solomon (5th)	6 ft 9 in (2.06 m)	210 lb (95 kg)	Sr	Caldwell CCTI	Enfield, North Carolina
PG	1	Julian Clarke	6 ft 1 in (1.85 m)	170 lb (77 kg)	So	Lake Highland Prep	Orlando, Florida
G	2	Rasheed Baldwin	6 ft 5 in (1.96 m)	190 lb (86 kg)	Sr	Chowan	Charlotte, North Carolina
G/F	3	Kameron Taylor	6 ft 7 in (2.01 m)	185 lb (84 kg)	So	Carmel Christian School	Charlotte, North Carolina
F	5	Myles Mayfield	6 ft 8 in (2.03 m)	200 lb (91 kg)	Fr	Edgewater High School	Orlando, Florida
G	7	Connor Dubsky	6 ft 4 in (1.93 m)	195 lb (88 kg)	Jr	Rhode Island	Woodbridge, Virginia
G	8	DJ Patrick	6 ft 6 in (1.98 m)	205 lb (93 kg)	RS Sr	Charleston Southern	Powder Springs, Georgia
G	10	Hugo Maton	6 ft 2 in (1.88 m)	185 lb (84 kg)	Fr	Combine Academy	Lommel, Belgium
G	11	Jakel Powell	6 ft 5 in (1.96 m)	190 lb (86 kg)	RS So	Florida Atlantic	Raleigh, North Carolina
G	12	Mitchell Taylor	6 ft 3 in (1.91 m)	188 lb (85 kg)	Jr	South Carolina State	Atlanta, Georgia
F	13	Daniel Thomas	6 ft 8 in (2.03 m)	225 lb (102 kg)	Fr	New Mexico	Dallas, Texas
SF	14	Brayden Rivers	6 ft 7 in (2.01 m)	200 lb (91 kg)	Fr	Huntsville High School	Huntsville, Alabama
F/C	23	David Hermes	6 ft 10 in (2.08 m)	240 lb (109 kg)	Sr	UTSA	Stockholm, Sweden
G	24	Corey Jones	6 ft 2 in (1.88 m)	175 lb (79 kg)	Jr	Woodstock Academy	Wake Forest, North Carolina
F	44	Sage Tolentino	7 ft 1 in (2.16 m)	240 lb (109 kg)	RS Jr	Cincinnati	Kāneʻohe, Hawaii
G	55	Justin Wright (5th)	6 ft 2 in (1.88 m)	195 lb (88 kg)	Sr	Loyola Marymount	Greenville, North Carolina

Head coach

- Mike Morrell (Milligan)

Assistant coach(es)

- Woody Taylor (Eckerd)
- Justin Levine (Ithaca)
- Andrew Garcia (Tulane)
- (5th) Fifth-year senior

Legend

- (C) Team captain
- (S) Suspended
- (I) Ineligible
- (W) Walk-on
- Injured
- Current redshirt

Roster
Last update: October 22, 2025

== Schedule and results ==
Date time, TV	Rank^{#}	Opponent^{#}	Result	Record	Site (attendance) city, state
Exhibition
October 28, 2025*; 6:30 pm		Truett McConnell	W 92–54	–	Kimmel Arena (462); Asheville, NC
Non-conference regular season
November 4, 2025*; 7:30 pm, ESPN+		at Wichita State	L 58–75	0–1	Charles Koch Arena (5,366); Wichita, KS
November 8, 2025*; 3:00 pm, ESPN+		at Georgia Southern	L 90–93	0–2	Hill Convocation Center (1,523); Statesboro, GA
November 11, 2025*; 6:30 pm, ESPN+		Lipscomb	W 69–64	1–2	Kimmel Arena (617); Asheville, NC
November 13, 2025*; 6:30 pm, ESPN+		Bryan	W 92–54	2–2	Kimmel Arena (489); Asheville, NC
November 19, 2025*; 7:30 pm, ESPN+		at Western Carolina	L 73–80	2–3	Ramsey Center (2,387); Cullowhee, NC
November 25, 2025*; 6:30 pm, ESPN+		Tennessee State	L 73–75	2–4	Kimmel Arena (687); Asheville, NC
November 30, 2025*; 1:30 pm, ESPN+		vs. Appalachian State	W 67–55	3–4	Harrah's Cherokee Center (1,132); Asheville, NC
December 2, 2025*; 7:00 pm, ESPN+		vs. UNC Greensboro	W 82–77	4–4	Harrah's Cherokee Center (444); Asheville, NC
December 6, 2025*; 1:00 pm, The CW		at NC State	L 63–75	4–5	Lenovo Center (14,862); Raleigh, NC
December 10, 2025*; 6:30 pm, ESPN+/WYCW		Miami (OH)	L 87–90 ^{OT}	4–6	Kimmel Arena (903); Asheville, NC
December 13, 2025*; 2:00 pm, ESPN+		St. Thomas	L 59–80	4–7	Kimmel Arena (723); Asheville, NC
December 16, 2025*; 6:30 pm, ESPN+		Kentucky Christian	W 83–73	5–7	Kimmel Arena (413); Asheville, NC
December 18, 2025*; 6:30 pm, ESPN+		Morris	W 89–56	6–7	Kimmel Arena (443); Asheville, NC
December 21, 2025*; 2:00 pm, ESPN+		at UAB	L 47–72	6–8	Bartow Arena (3,161); Birmingham, AL
Big South regular season
December 31, 2025; 2:00 pm, ESPN+		High Point	L 69–87	6–9 (0–1)	Kimmel Arena (1,471); Asheville, NC
January 3, 2026; 2:00 pm, ESPN+		at Charleston Southern	L 83–86	6–10 (0–2)	Buccaneer Field House (703); North Charleston, SC
January 7, 2026; 6:30 pm, ESPN+		Longwood	W 72–61	7–10 (1–2)	Kimmel Arena (1,162); Asheville, NC
January 10, 2026; 2:30 pm, ESPN+		at Radford	W 91–72	8–10 (2–2)	Dedmon Center (997); Radford, VA
January 14, 2026; 7:00 pm, ESPN+		at Presbyterian	L 70–71	8–11 (2–3)	Templeton Center (523); Clinton, SC
January 17, 2026; 2:00 pm, ESPN+		Winthrop	L 67−69	8−12 (2−4)	Kimmel Arena (1,496); Asheville, NC
January 21, 2026; 7:00 pm, ESPN+		at USC Upstate	W 83−69	9−12 (3−4)	G. B. Hodge Center (441); Spartanburg, SC
January 29, 2026; 6:30 pm, ESPN+		Gardner–Webb	W 69–50	10−12 (4−4)	Kimmel Arena (1,016); Asheville, NC
January 31, 2026; 2:00 pm, ESPN+		at Winthrop	L 71−84	10−13 (4−5)	Winthrop Coliseum (1,400); Rock Hill, SC
February 4, 2026; 6:30 pm, ESPN+		USC Upstate	W 76–67	11–13 (5–5)	Kimmel Arena (876); Asheville, NC
February 12, 2026; 7:00 pm, ESPNU		at Longwood	W 79–74	12–13 (6–5)	Joan Perry Brock Center (2,479); Farmville, VA
February 14, 2026; 2:00 pm, ESPN+		Presbyterian	L 57–58	12–14 (6–6)	Kimmel Arena (1,032); Asheville, NC
February 19, 2026; 7:00 pm, ESPNU		at High Point	L 48–74	12–15 (6–7)	Qubein Center (4,232); High Point, NC
February 21, 2026; 4:30 pm, ESPN+		Radford	W 74–73 ^{OT}	13–15 (7–7)	Kimmel Arena (1,627); Asheville, NC
February 26, 2026; 7:00 pm, ESPN+		at Gardner–Webb	W 77–71	14–15 (8–7)	Paul Porter Arena (458); Boiling Springs, NC
February 28, 2026; 2:00 pm, ESPN+		Charleston Southern	L 75–92	14–16 (8–8)	Kimmel Arena (1,808); Asheville, NC
Big South tournament
March 6, 2026; 6:00 pm, ESPN+	(4)	vs. (5) Longwood; Quarterfinals	W 85–82 ^{OT}	15–16	Freedom Hall Civic Center; Johnson City, TN
March 7, 2026; 12:00 pm, ESPN+	(4)	vs. (1) High Point; Semifinals	L 71–75	15–17	Freedom Hall Civic Center; Johnson City, TN
*Non-conference game. ^{#}Rankings from AP Poll. (#) Tournament seedings in parentheses. All times are in Eastern.
