= 2025–26 Radford Highlanders men's basketball team =

American college basketball season

2025–26 Radford Highlanders men's basketball
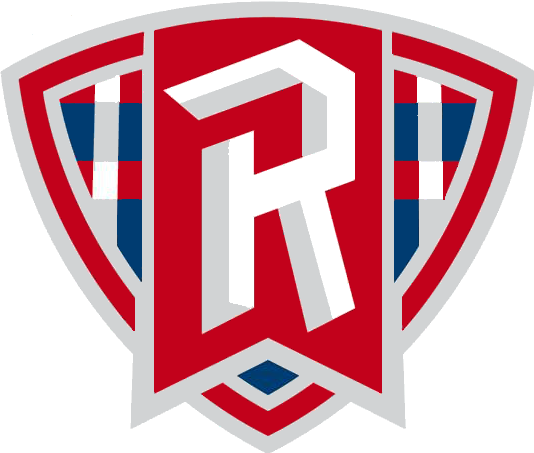
- Conference: Big South Conference
- Record: 16–16 (9–7 Big South)
- Head coach: Zach Chu (1st season)
- Associate head coach: Marcus Jenkins
- Assistant coaches: Jordan Surenkamp; Josh Adel; Conor Dow; David Watkins
- Home arena: Dedmon Center

2025–26 Big South men's basketball standings
| | Conf. | | | | Overall |
| Team | W | | L | PCT | W | | L | PCT |
|---|---|---|---|---|---|---|---|---|
| High Point † | 15 | – | 1 | .938 | 31 | – | 5 | .861 |
| Winthrop | 13 | – | 3 | .813 | 23 | – | 11 | .676 |
| Radford | 9 | – | 7 | .563 | 16 | – | 16 | .500 |
| UNC Asheville | 8 | – | 8 | .500 | 15 | – | 17 | .469 |
| Longwood | 8 | – | 8 | .500 | 16 | – | 16 | .500 |
| Presbyterian | 7 | – | 9 | .438 | 15 | – | 18 | .455 |
| Charleston Southern | 6 | – | 10 | .375 | 15 | – | 17 | .469 |
| USC Upstate | 5 | – | 11 | .313 | 13 | – | 19 | .406 |
| Gardner–Webb | 1 | – | 15 | .063 | 4 | – | 29 | .121 |
† 2026 Big South tournament winner

The 2025–26 Radford Highlanders men's basketball team represented Radford University during the 2025–26 NCAA Division I men's basketball season. The Highlanders, led by first-year head coach Zach Chu, played their home games at the Dedmon Center in Radford, Virginia as members of the Big South Conference. They finished the season 16–16, 9–7 in Big South play, to finish in third place. In the Big South tournament, the Highlanders were defeated by Presbyterian in the quarterfinals.

== Previous season ==
The Highlanders finished the 2024–25 season 20–13, 9–7 in Big South play, to finish in fourth place. They defeated Presbyterian in the quarterfinals of the Big South tournament, before falling to top-seeded and eventual tournament champions High Point in the semifinals.

On March 11, 2025, it was announced that head coach Darris Nichols would be leaving the program after four seasons, in order to take the head coaching position at La Salle. Five days later, on March 16, the school announced that they would be hiring SMU chief strategist Zach Chu as the team's new head coach.

== Preseason ==
On October 15, 2025, the Big South Conference released their preseason coaches poll. Radford was picked to finish fourth in the conference.

=== Preseason rankings ===
Big South Preseason Poll
| Place | Team | Points |
|---|---|---|
| 1 | High Point | 80 (8) |
| 2 | UNC Asheville | 68 (1) |
| 3 | Longwood | 53 |
| 4 | Radford | 52 |
| 5 | Winthrop | 51 |
| 6 | Presbyterian | 37 |
| 7 | Charleston Southern | 27 |
| 8 | Gardner–Webb | 19 |
| 9 | USC Upstate | 18 |
(#) first-place votes

=== Preseason All-Big South Teams ===
Preseason All-Big South First Team
| Player | Year | Position |
|---|---|---|
| Jaylon Johnson | Senior | Guard |

== Roster ==
2025–26 Radford Highlanders men's basketball team
Players
Coaches

| Pos. | # | Name | Height | Weight | Year | Previous school | Hometown |
|---|---|---|---|---|---|---|---|
| G | 1 | Zion Walker | 6 ft 2 in (1.88 m) | 205 lb (93 kg) | So | The Burlington School | Burlington, NC |
| G | 3 | Jaylon Johnson | 6 ft 0 in (1.83 m) | 170 lb (77 kg) | Sr | Tennessee Tech | Houston, TX |
| G | 4 | Brennan Jr. Rigsby | 6 ft 3 in (1.91 m) | 185 lb (84 kg) | GS | Minnesota | De Beque, CO |
| G | 5 | Mari Jordan | 6 ft 5 in (1.96 m) | 190 lb (86 kg) | RS So | Tulane | Atlanta, GA |
| F | 5 | Louie Jordan | 6 ft 9 in (2.06 m) | 220 lb (100 kg) | Sr | UMBC | Leicester, England |
| F | 7 | Frederik Erichsen | 6 ft 9 in (2.06 m) | — | Fr | Ratiopharm Ulm | Copenhagen, Denmark |
| G | 10 | Del Jones | 6 ft 3 in (1.91 m) | 187 lb (85 kg) | So | Clemson | Landover, MD |
| G | 11 | Dennis Jr. Parker | 6 ft 6 in (1.98 m) | 205 lb (93 kg) | Jr | NC State | Richmond, VA |
| C | 12 | Gabriel Ferreira | 6 ft 10 in (2.08 m) | — | Fr | NBA Academy Latin America | Paulista, Brazil |
| G | 13 | Bradley Land | 6 ft 6 in (1.98 m) | — | RS Jr | Colorado Christian | Dallas, TX |
| F | 21 | Tyson Brown | 6 ft 9 in (2.06 m) | 225 lb (102 kg) | GS | Georgia Southern | Virginia Beach, VA |
| G | 24 | Lukas Walls | 6 ft 5 in (1.96 m) | 203 lb (92 kg) | Jr | Samford | Knoxville, TN |
| G | 30 | Warren Jr. Keel | 6 ft 0 in (1.83 m) | — | Fr | Putnam Science Academy | Lynn, MA |
| G | 31 | Diogo Alves | 6 ft 2 in (1.88 m) | — | Fr | Tualatin High School | Tualatin, OR |

Head coach

- Zach Chu (Richmond)

Assistant coach(es)

- Marcus Jenkins (Air Force)
- Jordan Surenkamp (South Alabama)
- Josh Adel (Florida)
- Conor Dow (Clark)
- David Watkins (New Hampshire)

Legend

- (C) Team captain
- (S) Suspended
- (I) Ineligible
- (W) Walk-on
- Injured
- Current redshirt

Roster
Last update: October 21, 2025

== Schedule and results ==
| Date time, TV | Rank^{#} | Opponent^{#} | Result | Record | Site (attendance) city, state |
Exhibition
| October 29, 2025*; 7:00 p.m. | | Bridgewater | W 95–56 | | Dedmon Center; Radford, VA |
Non-conference regular season
| November 3, 2025*; 7:00 p.m., ESPN+ | | Western Illinois | W 80–75 | 1–0 | Dedmon Center (1,767); Radford, VA |
| November 7, 2025*; 7:00 p.m., ESPN+ | | West Virginia Wesleyan | W 99–61 | 2–0 | Dedmon Center (1,549); Radford, VA |
| November 11, 2025*; 7:00 p.m., ACCN | | at No. 18 North Carolina | L 74–89 | 2–1 | Dean Smith Center (16,613); Chapel Hill, NC |
| November 15, 2025*; 3:30 p.m., PTB Live | | vs. Wright State; Greenbrier Tip-Off River Division | L 59–92 | 2–2 | Colonial Hall (476); White Sulphur Springs, WV |
| November 16, 2025*; 2:30 p.m., PTB Live | | vs. Cleveland State; Greenbrier Tip-Off River Division | L 82–87 | 2–3 | Colonial Hall (459); White Sulphur Springs, WV |
| November 18, 2025*; 7:00 p.m., SECN+ | | at South Carolina | L 58–87 | 2–4 | Colonial Life Arena (11,623); Columbia, SC |
| November 21, 2025*; 7:00 p.m., ESPN+ | | UNC Wilmington | L 73–81 | 2–5 | Dedmon Center (1,584); Radford, VA |
| November 24, 2025*; 8:00 p.m., ACCNX | | at SMU | L 72–89 | 2–6 | Moody Coliseum (4,421); University Park, TX |
| November 29, 2025*; 2:30 p.m., ESPN+ | | Notre Dame (MD) | W 102–75 | 3–6 | Dedmon Center (828); Radford, VA |
| December 3, 2025*; 7:00 p.m., ESPN+ | | Southern Miss | L 75–82 | 3–7 | Dedmon Center (1,788); Radford, VA |
| December 7, 2025*; 2:30 p.m., ESPN+ | | Saint Francis | W 89–56 | 4–7 | Dedmon Center (924); Radford, VA |
| December 14, 2025*; 2:30 p.m., ESPN+ | | Coppin State | W 107–77 | 5–7 | Dedmon Center (861); Radford, VA |
| December 18, 2025*; 7:00 p.m. | | at William & Mary | L 83–96 | 5–8 | Kaplan Arena (2,790); Williamsburg, VA |
| December 21, 2025*; 2:30 p.m., ESPN+ | | VMI | W 97–90 | 6–8 | Dedmon Center (954); Radford, VA |
| December 28, 2025*; 2:30 p.m., ESPN+ | | Shenandoah | W 87–44 | 7–8 | Dedmon Center (966); Radford, VA |
Big South regular season
| December 31, 2025; 7:00 p.m., ESPN+ | | at USC Upstate | W 76–69 | 8–8 (1–0) | G. B. Hodge Center; Spartanburg, SC |
| January 7, 2026; 7:00 p.m., ESPN+ | | Presbyterian | W 80–61 | 9–8 (2–0) | Dedmon Center (878); Radford, VA |
| January 10, 2026; 2:30 p.m., ESPN+ | | UNC Asheville | L 72–91 | 9–9 (2–1) | Dedmon Center (997); Radford, VA |
| January 14, 2026; 7:00 p.m., ESPN+ | | at Gardner–Webb | W 89–80 | 10–9 (3–1) | Paul Porter Arena (765); Boiling Springs, NC |
| January 17, 2026; 2:30 p.m., ESPN+ | | Longwood | W 85–83 | 11–9 (4–1) | Dedmon Center (1.259); Radford, VA |
| January 21, 2026; 6:30 p.m., ESPN+ | | at Winthrop | L 75–76 | 11–10 (4–2) | Winthrop Coliseum (1,551); Rock Hill, SC |
| January 24, 2026; 2:30 p.m., ESPN+ | | High Point | L 83–93 | 11–11 (4–3) | Dedmon Center (1,118); Radford, VA |
| January 29, 2026; 7:00 p.m., ESPN+ | | at Charleston Southern | W 84–75 | 12–11 (5–3) | Buccaneer Field House (812); North Charleston, SC |
| January 31, 2026; 2:00 p.m., ESPN+ | | at Presbyterian | W 93–84 | 13–11 (6–3) | Templeton Center (637); Clinton, SC |
| February 4, 2026; 7:00 p.m., ESPN+ | | Winthrop | L 78–80 | 13–12 (6–4) | Dedmon Center (1,814); Radford, VA |
| February 7, 2026; 7:00 p.m., ESPN+ | | at High Point | L 77–86 | 13–13 (6–5) | Qubein Center (7,202); High Point, NC |
| February 14, 2026; 2:30 p.m., ESPN+ | | Charleston Southern | W 90–80 | 14–13 (7–5) | Dedmon Center (1,363); Radford, VA |
| February 19, 2026; 7:00 p.m., ESPN+ | | Gardner–Webb | W 82–70 | 15–13 (8–5) | Dedmon Center (953); Radford, VA |
| February 21, 2026; 4:30 p.m., ESPN+ | | at UNC Asheville | L 73–74 ^{OT} | 15–14 (8–6) | Kimmel Arena (1,627); Asheville, NC |
| February 26, 2026; 7:00 p.m., ESPN+ | | USC Upstate | W 71–59 | 16–14 (8–7) | Dedmon Center (971); Radford, VA |
| February 28, 2026; 3:00 p.m., ESPN+ | | at Longwood | L 74–90 | 16–15 (8–8) | Joan Perry Brock Center (3,181); Farmville, VA |
Big South tournament
| March 6, 2026; 8:30 p.m., ESPN+ | (3) | vs. (6) Presbyterian; Quarterfinals | L 85–91 ^{OT} | 16–16 | Freedom Hall Civic Center (1,418); Johnson City, TN |
*Non-conference game. ^{#}Rankings from AP poll. (#) Tournament seedings in parentheses. All times are in Eastern.
