= 2025–26 Longwood Lancers men's basketball team =

American college basketball season

2025–26 Longwood Lancers men's basketball
- Conference: Big South Conference
- Record: 16–16 (8–8 Big South)
- Head coach: Ronnie Thomas (1st season)
- Associate head coach: Marty McGillan; Tom Palombo
- Assistant coaches: Matt Sholtis; Emmanuel Matey; Myo Baxter-Bell; Odri Dedolli
- Home arena: Joan Perry Brock Center

2025–26 Big South men's basketball standings
	Conf.				Overall
Team	W		L	PCT	W		L	PCT
High Point †	15	–	1	.938	31	–	5	.861
Winthrop	13	–	3	.813	23	–	11	.676
Radford	9	–	7	.563	16	–	16	.500
UNC Asheville	8	–	8	.500	15	–	17	.469
Longwood	8	–	8	.500	16	–	16	.500
Presbyterian	7	–	9	.438	15	–	18	.455
Charleston Southern	6	–	10	.375	15	–	17	.469
USC Upstate	5	–	11	.313	13	–	19	.406
Gardner–Webb	1	–	15	.063	4	–	29	.121
† 2026 Big South tournament winner

The 2025–26 Longwood Lancers men's basketball team represented Longwood University during the 2025–26 NCAA Division I men's basketball season. The Lancers, led by first-year head coach Ronnie Thomas, played their home games at the Joan Perry Brock Center in Farmville, Virginia as members of the Big South Conference. They finished the season with a 16–16 record, 8–8 in Big South play, to finish in a tie for fourth place. They lost to UNC Asheville in the quarterfinals of the Big South tournament.

== Previous season ==
The Lancers finished the 2024–25 season 18–14, 7–9 in Big South play, to finish in a tie for fifth place. They were defeated by Winthrop in the quarterfinals of the Big South tournament.

On March 23, 2025, it was announced that head coach Griff Aldrich would be leaving the program after seven seasons, in order to take the associate head coaching position at Virginia. On the same day, the school announced that they would be naming assistant coach Ronnie Thomas as the team's new head coach.

== Preseason ==
On October 15, 2025, the Big South Conference released their preseason coaches poll. Longwood was picked to finish third in the conference.

=== Preseason rankings ===
Big South Preseason Poll
Place	Team	Points
1	High Point	80 (8)
2	UNC Asheville	68 (1)
3	Longwood	53
4	Radford	52
5	Winthrop	51
6	Presbyterian	37
7	Charleston Southern	27
8	Gardner–Webb	19
9	USC Upstate	18
(#) first-place votes

=== Preseason All-Big South Teams ===
Preseason All-Big South First Team
Player	Year	Position
Elijah Tucker	RS Senior	Forward

== Roster ==
2025–26 Longwood Lancers men's basketball team
Players
Coaches

Pos.	#	Name	Height	Weight	Year	Previous school	Hometown
F	0	Johan Nziemi	6 ft 6 in (1.98 m)	227 lb (103 kg)	GS	Independence Community College	Manhattan, NY
G	1	Jacoi Hutchinson	6 ft 3 in (1.91 m)	188 lb (85 kg)	Jr	George Washington	Laurel, MD
G	2	Redd Jr. Thompson	6 ft 0 in (1.83 m)	185 lb (84 kg)	So	James Madison	Richmond, VA
G/F	3	Alphonzo III Billups	6 ft 7 in (2.01 m)	180 lb (82 kg)	RS Jr	VCU	Richmond, VA
G/F	4	Emanuel Richards	6 ft 4 in (1.93 m)	212 lb (96 kg)	Jr	Christ School	Irmo, SC
G	5	KJ McClurg	6 ft 3 in (1.91 m)	189 lb (86 kg)	RS Sr	California (PA)	Morgantown, WV
G/F	7	Elijah Kelly	6 ft 7 in (2.01 m)	195 lb (88 kg)	Fr	Miller School of Albemarle	Radford, VA
F	8	Isaiah Kalala	6 ft 9 in (2.06 m)	220 lb (100 kg)	Fr	Sunrise Christian Academy	Dallas, TX
G	10	Gerald III Burr	6 ft 2 in (1.88 m)	160 lb (73 kg)	Fr	IMG Academy	Richmond, VA
F	11	Jaylin Payne	6 ft 8 in (2.03 m)	228 lb (103 kg)	Jr	Daytona State College	Landover, MD
F	23	Elijah Jones	6 ft 7 in (2.01 m)	207 lb (94 kg)	GS	Charleston	South Holland, IL
G	24	Jaylen Benard	6 ft 2 in (1.88 m)	207 lb (94 kg)	Jr	Cypress Ranch High School	Houston, TX
G	30	Jerome Williams	6 ft 0 in (1.83 m)	165 lb (75 kg)	Fr	Mt. Zion Preparatory Academy	Minneapolis, MN
F	35	Quadri Bashiru	6 ft 10 in (2.08 m)	220 lb (100 kg)	Fr	The Hill School	Ibadan, Nigeria
F	77	Elijah Tucker	6 ft 8 in (2.03 m)	232 lb (105 kg)	RS Sr	Xavier	Canton, GA

Head coach

- Ronnie Thomas (Bridgewater)

Assistant coach(es)

- Marty McGillan (UNC Wilmington)
- Tom Palombo (Virginia Wesleyan)
- Matt Sholtis (Charlotte)
- Emmanuel Matey (Gannon)
- Myo Baxter-Bell (Liberty)
- Odri Dedolli (Mount St. Mary's)

Legend

- (C) Team captain
- (S) Suspended
- (I) Ineligible
- (W) Walk-on
- Injured
- Current redshirt

Roster
Last update: October 21, 2025

== Schedule and results ==
Date time, TV	Rank^{#}	Opponent^{#}	Result	Record	Site (attendance) city, state
Non-conference regular season
November 3, 2025*; 7:00 p.m., ESPN+		Mary Baldwin	W 92–55	1–0	Joan Perry Brock Center (2,341); Farmville, VA
November 7, 2025*; 7:00 p.m., ACCNX		at Pittsburgh	L 60–78	1–1	Petersen Events Center (5,134); Pittsburgh, PA
November 12, 2025*; 7:00 p.m., ESPN+		James Madison	W 82–72	2–1	Joan Perry Brock Center (3,117); Farmville, VA
November 15, 2025*; 3:00 p.m., ESPN+		Binghamton	W 90–82	3–1	Joan Perry Brock Center (3,009); Farmville, VA
November 18, 2025*; 7:00 p.m., ESPN+		Maryland Eastern Shore	L 82–83 ^{2OT}	3–2	Joan Perry Brock Center (1,236); Farmville, VA
November 23, 2025*; 2:00 p.m., ESPN+		at Columbia	L 70–95	3–3	Levien Gymnasium (793); New York, NY
November 28, 2025*; 1:00 p.m.		vs. Siena; Capital Thanksgiving Classic	L 63–70	3–4	Bender Arena (572); Washington, D.C.
November 29, 2025*; 1:00 p.m.		vs. Maine; Capital Thanksgiving Classic	W 65–61	4–4	Bender Arena (191); Washington, D.C.
November 30, 2025*; 4:00 p.m., ESPN+		at American; Capital Thanksgiving Classic	L 66–92	4–5	Bender Arena (828); Washington, D.C.
December 3, 2025*; 7:00 p.m., ESPN+		Pfeiffer	W 101–55	5–5	Joan Perry Brock Center (1,237); Farmville, VA
December 6, 2025*; 4:00 p.m., ESPN+		at Morgan State	W 84–80	6–5	Hill Field House; Baltimore, MD
December 13, 2025*; 3:00 p.m., ESPN+		Delaware State	L 76–81	6–6	Joan Perry Brock Center (1,294); Farmville, VA
December 17, 2025*; 7:00 p.m., ACCNX		at Wake Forest	L 68–71	6–7	LJVM Coliseum (6,172); Winston-Salem, NC
December 20, 2025*; 2:00 p.m., ESPN+		at North Carolina Central	W 74–72	7–7	McDougald–McLendon Arena (391); Durham, NC
December 28, 2025*; 3:00 p.m., ESPN+		Averett	W 92–49	8–7	Joan Perry Brock Center (1,224); Farmville, VA
Big South regular season
December 31, 2025; 3:00 p.m., ESPN+		Winthrop	W 82–70	9–7 (1–0)	Joan Perry Brock Center (1,913); Farmville, VA
January 3, 2026; 7:00 p.m., ESPN+		at High Point	L 67–80	9–8 (1–1)	Qubein Center (2,143); High Point, NC
January 7, 2026; 6:30 p.m., ESPN+		at UNC Asheville	L 61–72	9–9 (1–2)	Kimmel Arena (1,162); Asheville, NC
January 10, 2026; 3:00 p.m., ESPN+		Presbyterian	W 77–70	10–9 (2–2)	Joan Perry Brock Center (1,448); Farmville, VA
January 17, 2026; 2:30 p.m., ESPN+		at Radford	L 83–85	10–10 (2–3)	Dedmon Center (1,259); Radford, VA
January 21, 2026; 7:00 p.m., ESPN+		Gardner–Webb	W 91–56	11–10 (3–3)	Joan Perry Brock Center (1,315); Farmville, VA
January 24, 2026; 4:00 p.m., ESPN+		Charleston Southern	W 81–79 ^{OT}	12–10 (4–3)	Joan Perry Brock Center (1,123); Farmville, VA
January 29, 2026; 7:00 p.m., ESPN+		at USC Upstate	L 60–65	12–11 (4–4)	G. B. Hodge Center (703); Spartanburg, SC
January 31, 2026; 3:00 p.m., ESPN+		High Point	L 59–71	12–12 (4–5)	Joan Perry Brock Center (2,588); Farmville, VA
February 4, 2026; 7:00 p.m., ESPN+		at Gardner–Webb	W 86–66	13–12 (5–5)	Paul Porter Arena (430); Boiling Springs, NC
February 7, 2026; 2:00 p.m., ESPN+		at Winthrop	L 74–79	13–13 (5–6)	Winthrop Coliseum (2,041); Rock Hill, SC
February 12, 2026; 7:00 p.m., ESPNU		UNC Asheville	L 74–79	13–14 (5–7)	Joan Perry Brock Center (2,479); Farmville, VA
February 14, 2026; 3:00 p.m., ESPN+		USC Upstate	W 82–75 ^{OT}	14–14 (6–7)	Joan Perry Brock Center (2,173); Farmville, VA
February 19, 2026; 7:00 p.m., ESPN+		at Presbyterian	L 65–72	14–15 (6–8)	Templeton Center (265); Clinton, SC
February 21, 2026; 4:00 p.m., ESPN+		at Charleston Southern	W 107–96 ^{2OT}	15–15 (7–8)	Buccaneer Field House (803); North Charleston, SC
February 28, 2026; 3:00 p.m., ESPN+		Radford	W 90–74	16–15 (8–8)	Joan Perry Brock Center (3,181); Farmville, VA
Big South tournament
March 6, 2026; 6:00 p.m., ESPN+	(5)	vs. (4) UNC Asheville; Quarterfinals	L 82–85 ^{OT}	16–16	Freedom Hall Civic Center; Johnson City, TN
*Non-conference game. ^{#}Rankings from AP poll. (#) Tournament seedings in parentheses. All times are in Eastern.
