= Flynn Clayman =

American basketball coach (born 1988)

Current position
- Title: Head coach
- Team: High Point
- Conference: Big South
- Record: 37–5 (.881)

Biographical details
- Born: September 27, 1988 (age 38); Los Angeles, California, U.S.

Playing career
- 2007–2009: Colorado State
- 2010–2011: Troy

Coaching career (HC unless noted)
- 2017–2019: Southern Utah (special assistant)
- 2019–2022: Southern Utah (assistant)
- 2022–2023: Southern Utah (associate HC)
- 2023: Southern Utah (interim HC)
- 2023–2025: High Point (associate HC)
- 2025–present: High Point

Head coaching record
- Overall: 39–6 (.867)
- Tournaments: 1–1 (NCAA Tournament); 2–1 (CBI)

Accomplishments and honors

Championships
- Big South regular season (2026); Big South tournament (2026)

Awards
- Big South co-Coach of the Year (2026)

Flynn Henry Clayman (born September 27, 1988) is an American basketball coach who is the head men's basketball coach for the High Point University.

== Early life ==
Clayman attended Venice High School where he played basketball under Rasheed Hazzard.

== Playing career ==
Clayman played his college career at Colorado State and Troy, where he played in 49 games starting in one. He averaged 2.9 points per game, 0.6 rebounds per game, and 0.4 assists per game.

After college Claymen went on to play professionally from 2012 until 2016 for the Dinamo Tbilisi, Sorocabana, Hapoel Eilat, Galil Elyon, Gilboa Galil, and Elitzur Yavne.

== Coaching career ==
Clayman started his coaching career in Sydney, Australia for AUSA Hoops from 2015-2017.

Clayman then moved into the NCAA with the Southern Utah Thunderbirds as a special assistant. Then he would be promoted to a full time assistant coach for the Thunderbirds. Then he would again be promoted by the Thunderbirds this time to associate head coach. On March 13, 2023, after Todd Simon left for Bowling Green, Clayman was named the interim head coach. During his stint as the interim head coach he compiled a 2–1 record for the Thunderbirds. From there, he was hired as the associate head coach for the High Point Panthers. On April 11, 2025, a day after former HPU head coach Alan Huss left the school to become associate head coach and head-coach-in-waiting at Creighton, Clayman was promoted to head coach.

== Personal life ==
Clayman is married to Katie Clayman, who is an assistant coach for the High Point women's basketball team. They have a son named Quinn.

== Head coaching record ==
Record table
Season	Team	Overall	Conference	Standing	Postseason
Southern Utah Thunderbirds (Western Athletic Conference) (2023)
2022–23	Southern Utah	2–1	0–0		CBI Semifinals
Southern Utah:		2–1 (.667)	0–0 (–)		
High Point Panthers (Big South Conference) (2025–present)
2025–26	High Point	31–5	15–1	1st	NCAA Division I Round of 32
2026–27	High Point	6–0	0–0		
High Point:		37–5 (.881)	15–1 (.938)		
Total:		39–6 (.867)			
National champion Postseason invitational champion Conference regular season champion Conference regular season and conference tournament champion Division regular season champion Division regular season and conference tournament champion Conference tournament champion
