= 2026 Big South Conference men's basketball tournament =

American collegiate sporting event

- Classification: Division I
- Season: 2025–26
- Teams: 9
- Site: Freedom Hall Civic Center; Johnson City, Tennessee
- Champions: High Point (2nd title)
- Winning coach: Flynn Clayman (1st title)
- MVP: Terry Anderson (High Point)
- Television: ESPN+, ESPN2

2025–26 Big South men's basketball standings
	Conf.				Overall
Team	W		L	PCT	W		L	PCT
High Point †	15	–	1	.938	31	–	5	.861
Winthrop	13	–	3	.813	23	–	11	.676
Radford	9	–	7	.563	16	–	16	.500
UNC Asheville	8	–	8	.500	15	–	17	.469
Longwood	8	–	8	.500	16	–	16	.500
Presbyterian	7	–	9	.438	15	–	18	.455
Charleston Southern	6	–	10	.375	15	–	17	.469
USC Upstate	5	–	11	.313	13	–	19	.406
Gardner–Webb	1	–	15	.063	4	–	29	.121
† 2026 Big South tournament winner

The 2026 Big South men's basketball tournament was the postseason men's basketball tournament that ended the 2025–26 NCAA Division I men's basketball season of the Big South Conference. It was held from March 4–8 and played at the Freedom Hall Civic Center in Johnson City, Tennessee. The tournament winner, High Point, received the conference's automatic bid to the 2026 NCAA tournament.

== Seeds ==
All of the conference teams will compete in the tournament. The top seven teams will receive a first-round bye. Teams are seeded by record within the conference, with a tiebreaker system to seed teams with identical conference records.

The tiebreakers operate in the following order:

1. Head-to-head record.
2. Record against the top-ranked conference team not involved in the tie, going down the standings until the tie is broken. For this purpose, teams with the same conference record are considered collectively. If two teams were unbeaten or winless against an opponent but did not play the same number of games against that opponent, the tie is not considered broken.

Seed	School	Conference	Overall	Tiebreaker
1	High Point	15–1	27–4	
2	Winthrop	13–3	21–10	
3	Radford	9–7	16–15	
4	UNC Asheville	8–8	14–16	2–0 vs. Longwood
5	Longwood	8–8	16–15	0–2 vs. UNC Asheville
6	Presbyterian	7–9	14–17	
7	Charleston Southern	6–10	15–16	
8	USC Upstate	5–11	13–18	
9	Gardner–Webb	1–15	3–28	

== Schedule ==
Game	Time*	Matchup	Score	Channel
Opening round - Wednesday, March 4
1	7:30 p.m.	No. 8 USC Upstate vs No. 9 Gardner–Webb	64–65	ESPN+
Quarterfinals - Friday March 6
2	12:00 p.m.	No. 1 High Point vs No. 9 Gardner–Webb	81–59	ESPN+
3	2:30 p.m.	No. 2 Winthrop vs No. 7 Charleston Southern	86–81	ESPN+
4	6:00 p.m.	No. 4 UNC Asheville vs. No. 5 Longwood	85–82^{OT}	ESPN+
5	8:30 p.m.	No. 3 Radford vs No. 6 Presbyterian	85–91^{OT}	ESPN+
Semifinals - Saturday, March 7
6	12:00 p.m.	No. 1 High Point vs No. 4 UNC Asheville	75–71	ESPN+
7	2:30 p.m.	No. 2 Winthrop vs No. 6 Presbyterian	73–71	ESPN+
Championship - Sunday, March 8
8	12:00 p.m.	No. 1 High Point vs No. 2 Winthrop	91–76	ESPN2
*Game times in ET

== Bracket ==
Opening round Wednesday, March 4 ESPN+
8	USC Upstate	64
9	Gardner–Webb	65

Quarterfinals; Friday, March 6 ESPN+
1	High Point	81
9	Gardner–Webb	59
4	UNC Asheville	85*
5	Longwood	82
2	Winthrop	86
7	Charleston Southern	81
3	Radford	85
6	Presbyterian	91*

Semifinals; Saturday, March 7 ESPN+
1	High Point	75
4	UNC Asheville	71
2	Winthrop	73
6	Presbyterian	71

Championship; Sunday, March 8 ESPN2
1	High Point	91
2	Winthrop	76

* denotes overtime period

== Awards and Honors ==
=== All-Tournament Team ===
Player	Team
**Terry Anderson**	High Point
Rob Martin	High Point
Scotty Washington	High Point
Logan Duncomb	Winthrop
Kody Clouet	Winthrop
Toyaz Solomon	UNC Asheville

MVP in bold
