= 2025–26 Georgia Southern Eagles men's basketball team =

American college basketball season

2025–26 Georgia Southern Eagles men's basketball
- Conference: Sun Belt Conference
- Record: 21–16 (8–10 Sun Belt)
- Head coach: Charlie Henry (3rd season)
- Associate head coach: Kente' Hart
- Assistant coaches: Nori Johnson; George Neilson
- Home arena: Hill Convocation Center

2025–26 Sun Belt Conference men's basketball standings
	Conf.				Overall
Team	W		L	PCT	W		L	PCT
Troy †	12	–	6	.667	22	–	11	.667
Marshall	11	–	7	.611	19	–	13	.594
Coastal Carolina	11	–	7	.611	19	–	13	.594
Appalachian State	11	–	7	.611	19	–	13	.594
Texas State	11	–	7	.611	19	–	13	.594
South Alabama	11	–	7	.611	21	–	11	.656
Arkansas State	11	–	7	.611	20	–	12	.625
Southern Miss	9	–	9	.500	19	–	16	.543
James Madison	9	–	9	.500	18	–	15	.545
Georgia Southern	8	–	10	.444	21	–	16	.568
Old Dominion	7	–	11	.389	12	–	21	.364
Louisiana	7	–	11	.389	11	–	22	.333
Georgia State	7	–	11	.389	10	–	22	.313
Louisiana–Monroe	1	–	17	.056	4	–	28	.125
† 2026 Sun Belt tournament winner As of March 9, 2026

The 2025–26 Georgia Southern Eagles men's basketball team represented Georgia Southern University during the 2025–26 NCAA Division I men's basketball season. The Eagles, were led by third-year head coach Charlie Henry, and played their home games at the Hill Convocation Center in Statesboro, Georgia as members of the Sun Belt Conference.

== Previous season ==
The Eagles finished the 2024–25 season 17–16, 8–10 in Sun Belt play, to finish in a four-way tie for eighth place. They defeated Southern Miss, before falling to Georgia State in the third round of the Sun Belt tournament.

== Preseason ==
On October 20, 2025, the Sun Belt released their preseason poll. Georgia Southern was picked to finish tenth in the conference.

=== Preseason rankings ===
Sun Belt Preseason Poll
Place	Team	Points
1	James Madison	175 (1)
2	Arkansas State	154 (3)
3	South Alabama	152 (4)
4	Troy	148 (1)
5	Old Dominion	145 (2)
6	Marshall	128 (1)
7	Appalachian State	123 (1)
8	Texas State	106
9	Louisiana	95 (1)
10	Georgia Southern	66
11	Georgia State	59
12	Southern Miss	57
13	Coastal Carolina	43
14	Louisiana–Monroe	19
(#) first-place votes

=== Preseason All-Sun Belt Teams ===
Preseason All-Sun Belt Teams
Team	Player	Year	Position
First	Tyren Moore	Graduate Student	Guard
Third	Nakavieon White	Redshirt Senior	Forward

== Roster ==
2025–26 Georgia Southern Eagles men's basketball team
Players
Coaches

Pos.	#	Name	Height	Weight	Year	Previous school	Hometown
G	0	Jayden Williams	6 ft 6 in (1.98 m)	185 lb (84 kg)	Fr	Ramsay High School	Birmingham, Alabama
G	1	Dwayne Williams Jr.	6 ft 6 in (1.98 m)	180 lb (82 kg)	RS Fr	Academy of Central Florida	Baltimore, Maryland
G	2	Dallas Gardner	6 ft 3 in (1.91 m)	190 lb (86 kg)	Jr	UNC Pembroke	Charlotte, North Carolina
G	3	Khayri Dunn	6 ft 1 in (1.85 m)	190 lb (86 kg)	So	College of Southern Idaho	Conyers, Georgia
G	4	Cade Lomas	6 ft 3 in (1.91 m)	190 lb (86 kg)	Fr	Sequoyah High School	Canton, Georgia
F	5	Nakavieon White	6 ft 7 in (2.01 m)	220 lb (100 kg)	RS Sr	National Park College	Odessa, Texas
G	6	Amare Neal	5 ft 9 in (1.75 m)	163 lb (74 kg)	Fr	Tuckerman High School	Swifton, Arkansas
F	7	Tsvet Sotirov	6 ft 9 in (2.06 m)	220 lb (100 kg)	RS So	Northern Illinois	Sofia, Bulgaria
F	8	Cullen Schreiner	6 ft 7 in (2.01 m)	203 lb (92 kg)	Fr	Basha High School	Chandler, Arizona
G	9	Jefferson Koulibaly	6 ft 3 in (1.91 m)	190 lb (86 kg)	GS	Pacific	LaSalle, Quebec
G	10	Sean Van Dorn Jr.	6 ft 6 in (1.98 m)	196 lb (89 kg)	Fr	Tri-Cities High School	Atlanta, Georgia
F	11	Shainen Carter	6 ft 9 in (2.06 m)	203 lb (92 kg)	Sr	Bluefield State	Detroit, Michigan
G	12	Tyren Moore	5 ft 11 in (1.8 m)	185 lb (84 kg)	GS	UAB	Louisville, Kentucky
F	13	Alden Applewhite	6 ft 7 in (2.01 m)	210 lb (95 kg)	RS Sr	Murray State	Memphis, Tennessee
G	21	Spudd Webb	6 ft 4 in (1.93 m)	175 lb (79 kg)	GS	Emmanuel	Hartwell, Georgia
F	24	Andres Burney	6 ft 9 in (2.06 m)	210 lb (95 kg)	RS Sr	Georgetown College	Brundidge, Alabama
F	34	Pavle Ridesic	6 ft 8 in (2.03 m)	230 lb (104 kg)	Fr	Western Reserve Academy	Trebinje, Bosnia and Herzegovina

Head coach

- Charlie Henry (Madonna)

Assistant coach(es)

- Kente' Hart (Purdue)
- Nori Johnson (College of Charleston)
- George Neilson (Alabama)

Legend

- (C) Team captain
- (S) Suspended
- (I) Ineligible
- (W) Walk-on
- Injured
- Current redshirt

Roster
Last update: November 2, 2025

== Schedule and results ==
Date time, TV	Rank^{#}	Opponent^{#}	Result	Record	High points	High rebounds	High assists	Site (attendance) city, state
Non-conference regular season
November 4, 2025*; 7:00 pm, ESPN+		at East Carolina	L 89–92	0–1	21 – Alden	8 – Shainen	5 – Nakavieon	Williams Arena (3,259); Greenville, NC
November 8, 2025*; 3:00 pm, ESPN+		UNC Asheville	W 93–90	1–1	25 – Webb	9 – Burney	3 – White	Hill Convocation Center (1,523); Statesboro, GA
November 11, 2025*; 7:00 pm, ESPN+		at Florida Gulf Coast	W 95–94	2–1	20 – White	5 – Burney	6 – Webb	Alico Arena (1,848); Fort Myers, FL
November 14, 2025*; 6:00 pm, ESPN+		Johnson C. Smith	W 98–79	3–1	20 – Webb	9 – Sotirov	6 – Webb	Hill Convocation Center (202); Statesboro, GA
November 18, 2025*; 7:00 pm, ACCNX		at Georgia Tech	L 66–68	3–2	13 – Dunn	11 – Applewhite	4 – Webb	McCamish Pavilion (5,128); Atlanta, GA
November 21, 2025*; 6:00 pm, ACCNX		at Florida State	L 72–98	3–3	14 – Carter	9 – Sotirov	3 – Tied	Donald L. Tucker Center (3,977); Tallahassee, FL
November 24, 2025*; 6:30 pm, PTB Live		vs. Youngstown State; Jacksonville Classic	L 61–67	3–4	16 – Applewhite	7 – Webb	3 – Moore	John Hurst Adams Gymnasium (542); Jacksonville, FL
November 25, 2025*; 9:00 pm, PTB Live		vs. UTSA; Jacksonville Classic	L 64–77	3–5	18 – Applewhite	8 – Carter	3 – Koulibaly	John Hurst Adams Gymnasium (146); Jacksonville, FL
November 29, 2025*; 2:00 pm, ESPN+		Houston Christian	W 80–62	4–5	19 – Webb	10 – Applewhite	5 – Applewhite	Hill Convocation Center (1,116); Statesboro, GA
December 3, 2025*; 7:00 pm, ESPN+		Louisiana Tech	W 77–69	5–5	32 – Webb	8 – Webb	4 – Webb	Hill Convocation Center (1,921); Statesboro, GA
December 6, 2025*; 2:00 pm, ESPN+		at Gardner–Webb	W 88–84	6–5	15 – White	12 – Applewhite	4 – White	Paul Porter Arena (247); Boiling Springs, NC
December 11, 2025*; 7:00 pm, ESPN+		Coastal Georgia	W 100−58	7−5	21 – Tied	10 – Williams Jr.	7 – Webb	Hill Convocation Center (1,226); Statesboro, GA
December 13, 2025*; 7:00 pm, ESPN+		at West Georgia	W 91−85	8−5	20 – Tied	7 – Applewhite	4 – Moore	The Coliseum (686); Carrollton, GA
Sun Belt regular season
December 18, 2025; 8:00 pm, ESPN+		Georgia State; Modern Day Hate	W 90−67	9−5 (1−0)	19 – Applewhite	7 – Webb	5 – Webb	Hill Convocation Center (1,850); Statesboro, GA
December 20, 2025; 5:00 pm, ESPN+		James Madison	W 96−92 ^{OT}	10−5 (2−0)	25 – White	8 – Carter	3 – Tied	Hill Convocation Center (1,265); Statesboro, GA
January 1, 2026; 1:00 pm, ESPN+		at Coastal Carolina	W 82–81 ^{OT}	11–5 (3–0)	22 – Webb	11 – Applewhite	2 – Tied	HTC Center (1,508); Conway, SC
January 3, 2026; 3:30 pm, ESPN+		at Old Dominion	W 93–86	12–5 (4–0)	17 – Applewhite	10 – Webb	4 – White	Chartway Arena (4,665); Norfolk, VA
January 10, 2026; 2:00 pm, ESPNU		at South Alabama	L 71–87	12–6 (4–1)	15 – Webb	6 – Webb	3 – Webb	Mitchell Center (2,509); Mobile, AL
January 15, 2026; 7:00 pm, ESPN+		Old Dominion	W 87–84	13–6 (5–1)	21 – Moore	9 – Moore	3 – White	Hill Convocation Center (2,864); Statesboro, GA
January 17, 2026; 3:00 pm, ESPN+		Coastal Carolina	L 75–79 ^{OT}	13–7 (5–2)	34 – Moore	7 – Burney	4 – Webb	Hill Convocation Center (2,732); Statesboro, GA
January 22, 2026; 7:00 pm, ESPN+		Arkansas State	L 68–85	13–8 (5–3)	14 – Tied	6 – Carter	1 – Tied	Hill Convocation Center (2,676); Statesboro, GA
January 24, 2026; 3:00 pm, ESPN+		Troy	L 78–83	13–9 (5–4)	19 – Applewhite	6 – Webb	4 – Moore	Hill Convocation Center (3,025); Statesboro, GA
January 30, 2026; 3:00 pm, ESPN+		at Louisiana–Monroe	W 79–76	14–9 (6–4)	26 – Moore	7 – Applewhite	4 – Moore	Fredrick C. Hobdy Assembly Center; Grambling, LA
January 31, 2026; 4:00 pm, ESPN+		at Louisiana	L 60–69	14–10 (6–5)	18 – Webb	7 – Applewhite	4 – White	Cajundome (2,423); Lafayette, LA
February 4, 2026; 7:00 pm, ESPN+		Texas State	L 71–77	14–11 (6–6)	20 – Dunn	7 – Applewhite	3 – Tied	Hill Convocation Center (1,505); Statesboro, GA
February 11, 2026; 8:00 pm, ESPN+		Appalachian State	L 65–81	14–12 (6–7)	17 – Moore	5 – Tied	6 – Moore	Hill Convocation Center (1,812); Statesboro, GA
February 14, 2026; 8:30 pm, ESPNU		Marshall	W 101–87	15–12 (7–7)	32 – Moore	10 – Applewhite	4 – Applewhite	Hill Convocation Center (1,511); Statesboro, GA
February 19, 2026; 8:00 pm, ESPN+		at Georgia State; Modern Day Hate	L 64–66	15–13 (7–8)	14 – Moore	8 – Webb	3 – Tied	GSU Convocation Center (3,479); Atlanta, GA
February 21, 2026; 1:00 pm, ESPN+		at Appalachian State	L 74–89	15–14 (7–9)	24 – Applewhite	10 – Webb	5 – Moore	Holmes Center (3,701); Boone, NC
February 25, 2026; 8:00 pm, ESPN+		at James Madison	L 66–82	15–15 (7–10)	20 – Moore	7 – Applewhite	4 – Moore	Atlantic Union Bank Center (3,136); Harrisonburg, VA
February 27, 2026; 9:00 pm, ESPN2		at Marshall	W 99–82	16–15 (8–10)	26 – Moore	6 – Applewhite	3 – Tied	Cam Henderson Center (5,167); Huntington, WV
Sun Belt tournament
March 4, 2026; 8:30 pm, ESPN+	(10)	vs. (11) Old Dominion; Second round	W 88–84	17–15	19 – Webb	5 – Carter	5 – Webb	Pensacola Bay Center (931); Pensacola, FL
March 5, 2026; 8:30 pm, ESPN+	(10)	vs. (7) Arkansas State; Third round	W 80–77	18–15	25 – Moore	6 – Tied	4 – Tied	Pensacola Bay Center (1,374); Pensacola, FL
March 6, 2026; 8:30 pm, ESPN+	(10)	vs. (6) South Alabama; Fourth round	W 94–85	19–15	34 – Applewhite	9 – White	9 – Moore	Pensacola Bay Center (1,867); Pensacola, FL
March 7, 2026; 9:00 pm, ESPN+	(10)	vs. (3) Coastal Carolina; Quarterfinals	W 96–72	20–15	40 – Moore	10 – Applewhite	2 – Tied	Pensacola Bay Center (1,685); Pensacola, FL
March 8, 2026; 8:30 pm, ESPN+	(10)	vs. (2) Marshall; Semifinals	W 82–78	21–15	31 – Webb	11 – Burney	3 – White	Pensacola Bay Center (2,103); Pensacola, FL
March 9, 2026; 7:00 pm, ESPN2	(10)	vs. (1) Troy; Championship	L 61–77	21–16	16 – Webb	4 – Koulibaly	3 – Webb	Pensacola Bay Center (2,555); Pensacola, FL
*Non-conference game. ^{#}Rankings from AP Poll. (#) Tournament seedings in parentheses. All times are in Eastern.
