= High Point Panthers men's basketball =

Basketball team that represents High Point University

2026–27 High Point Panthers men's basketball team
- University: High Point University
- Head coach: Flynn Clayman (2nd season)
- Location: High Point, North Carolina
- Arena: Qubein Center (capacity: 4,500)
- Conference: Big South
- Nickname: Panthers
- Colors: Purple and white

NCAA Division I tournament round of 32
- 2026

NCAA Division I tournament appearances
- 2025, 2026

Conference tournament champions
- Carolinas; 1936, 1942, 1951, 1953, 1966, 1969, 1978, 1979, 1987, 1988, 1989, 1997 Big South: 2025, 2026

Conference regular-season champions
- Big South: 2013, 2014, 2015, 2016, 2024, 2025, 2026

The High Point Panthers men's basketball team is the basketball team that represents High Point University in High Point, North Carolina in NCAA Division I competition. The school's team competes in the Big South Conference. The Panthers have appeared twice in the NCAA Division I men's basketball tournament, most recently in 2026.

== History ==
The team, under the name High Point College, began play in the 1927–28 season with coach J.P. Boylin. The first game was on December 10, 1927, in a 37–35 win over the Carolina Night Hawks. The team went on to a 14–4 record. Boylin served as coach for three seasons and finished with a 39–16 record. He was followed by two seasons of coach Julian Beall who had two consecutive losing seasons and finished with a 16–21 record. The team began playing as part of the North State Intercollegiate Athletic Conference (NSC) in 1930.

=== First Virgil Yow stint ===
Virgil Yow, a multisport star at High Point College, was hired as the third coach for the team in 1932. After hovering around the .500 mark, for his first two seasons, the team went 18–4 in his third year and in the following year went 20–4 defeating Wake Forest along the way and winning the 1936 NSC men's basketball tournament 49–39 over Lenoir–Rhyne.

The program began playing in the National Association of Intercollegiate Athletics (NAIA) with the founding of the NAIA men's basketball championship in 1937. The team first made the NAIA tournament in 1939.

In 1944, during the height of World War II, the college was facing a male student shortage and thus had difficulty filling the basketball roster. Yow recruited female student Nancy Isenhour to play on the team and she became the first woman to play on a collegiate men's basketball team. Following the 1944–45 season, Yow left the school after 13 seasons, two conference championships, and two NAIA tournament appearances, to coach the Hanes Hosiery AAU women's team.

=== Ralph James and Bob Davis eras ===
Ralph James was hired as the football and basketball coach in 1945. James had previously played for Wake Forrest and served as head coach for Western Carolina in both football and basketball. He finished with a record of 81–45. Bob Davis was hired in 1950. Davis won two conference titles in three years. Davis left High Point after three seasons to coach at Georgetown College and eventually Auburn.

=== Second Virgil Yow stint ===
Following eight years coaching women's basketball and three AAU national titles, Yow returned to High Point. He coached nine more seasons before retiring with a record of 342–215.

=== Tom Quinn ===
Tom Quinn was announced as the head coach in 1962, coming from Newberry College and had previously won the Conference Carolinas title. He served in the capacity for four years compiling a record of 95–22. His teams made the NAIA tournament twice and won the Conference Carolinas tournament twice. He left to be the coach of East Carolina.

=== Jerry Steele tenure ===
Jerry Steele was hired in 1972 as the 10th head coach of the team. Steele had previously served as head coach of the professional ABA team the Carolina Cougars. He coached at High Point for 32 years, from 1972 to 2003. He won eight conference titles, made one appearance in the NAIA tournament.

Beginning in the 1993–94 academic year, the school and conference began transitioning to NCAA Division II. During his last decade, Steele earned two trips to the NCAA Division II men's basketball tournament. The team left Conference Carolinas in 1997 and joined the Big South Conference in 1999 and transitioned to NCAA Division I. His record at High Point was 493–412, making him the winningest coach in program history. Steele retired after the end of the 2002–03 season.

=== Bart Lundy ===
Bart Lundy who had taken Queens (NC) to the 2003 NCAA Division II Final Four, was hired to be the head coach. He went on to coach six seasons, compiling a record of 96–87, and leaving in 2009.

=== Scott Cherry ===
Scott Cherry was hired as coach on March 26, 2009. In his fourth year, the team won the Big South north division, earning them a spot in the 2013 CollegeInsider.com Postseason Tournament, this was the school's first postseason appearance since joining NCAA Division I. The following year, he again led the Panthers to a Big South north division championship, and the regular season championship, another program first. The Panthers were invited to the 2014 National Invitation Tournament, losing in the first round to Minnesota. Cherry led High Point to the best start in school history in 2014–15 campaign, starting the season 14–3. They qualified for the 2015 CollegeInsider.com Postseason Tournament. Cherry mutually agreed to part ways with the school in 2018.

=== Tubby Smith and G. G. Smith ===
Former High Point player and 1998 NCAA Division I men's basketball championship coach with Kentucky, Tubby Smith, was hired to be the team's head coach after having been fired by Memphis a few weeks prior. Additionally, a new arena was announced for the school. Smith coached for five seasons and resigned in favor of his son G. G. Smith. His son was fired the season after.

=== Alan Huss era ===
Creighton assistant coach Alan Huss was hired on March 27, 2023. He won the Big South regular season title in his first season. His second season he won the Big South regular season and tournament titles, which earned the team its first berth in the NCAA Division I tournament where they lost to Purdue in the first round. Huss went on to compile a 56–15 record in his two seasons before leaving HPU to return to Creighton as the head-coach-in-waiting for current Blue Jays' coach Greg McDermott on April 10, 2025.

=== Flynn Clayman era ===
On April 11, 2025, a day after Huss departed HPU, Panthers associate head coach Flynn Clayman was promoted to the position.

In Clayman’s first season as Panthers head coach he led the team to a 30-4 record, Big South regular season title, and Big South tournament title. After defeating Winthrop 91-76 in the Big South title game, High Point earned its second NCAA tournament appearance.

On March 19, 2026, #12-seeded High Point upset #5-seeded Wisconsin 83-82 in the 2026 NCAA tournament first round. This was the first March Madness victory in program history for High Point.

== Coaches ==
Coach	Years	Overall record
J.P. Boylin	1927–1931	39–16
Julian Beall	1931–1932	16–21
Virgil Yow	1932–1945	211–103
Ralph James	1945–1950	81–45
Bob Davis	1950–1953	56–36
Virgil Yow	1953–1962	131–112
Tom Quinn	1962–1966	95–22
Bob Vaughn	1966–1971	75–67
J.D. Barnett	1971–1972	13–16
Jerry Steele	1972–2003	493–412
Bart Lundy	2003–2009	96–87
Scott Cherry	2009–2018	146–134
Tubby Smith	2018–2022	41–75
G. G. Smith	2022–2023	17–20
Alan Huss	2023–2025	56–15
Flynn Clayman	2025–2026	31–5
Head coaches		15

== Notable players ==
- Tubby Smith (born 1951), coached several Division I basketball programs and won the 1998 NCAA Division I men's basketball tournament.
- Gene Littles (born 1943), played for High Point College from 1965-1969. Records for points, field goals, and free throws still stand. Drafted by the New York Knicks in the 1969 NBA draft and by the Dallas Chaparrals in the 1969 ABA Draft. Played 5 seasons with the Carolina Cougars and 1 season with the Kentucky Colonels.
- Arizona Reid (born 1986), Israeli National League basketball player
- John Brown III (born 1992), player for Maxima Roma of the Lega Basket Serie A (LBA) and the EuroCup

== Postseason ==
=== NCAA Division I ===
The Panthers have appeared in the NCAA Division I tournament two times. Their record is 1–2.

Year	Seed	Round	Opponent	Result
2025	#13	First round	#4 Purdue	L 63–75
2026	#12	First round Second round	#5 Wisconsin #4 Arkansas	W 83–82; L 88–94

=== NCAA Division II tournament results ===
The Panthers have appeared in the NCAA Division II tournament two times. Their combined record is 2–2.

Year	Round	Opponent	Result
1996	Regional Quarterfinals; Regional semifinals	Presbyterian; Queens (NC)	W 76–67; L 70–81
1997	Regional Quarterfinals; Regional semifinals	Pittsburgh–Johnstown; Salem International	W 94–92 ^{OT} L 82–91

=== NIT results ===
The Panthers have appeared in the National Invitation Tournament (NIT) two times. Their record is 0–2.

Year	Round	Opponent	Result
2014	First round	Minnesota	L 81–88
2016	First round	South Carolina	L 66–88

=== CIT results ===
The Panthers have appeared in the CollegeInsider.com Postseason Tournament (CIT) two times. Their record is 1–2.

Year	Round	Opponent	Result
2013	First round	UC Irvine	L 71–80
2015	First round Second Round	Maryland Eastern Shore; Eastern Kentucky	W 70–64; L 65–66

=== NAIA tournament results ===
The Panthers have appeared in the NAIA tournament seven times. Their combined record is 7–7.

Year	Round	Opponent	Result
1939	First round	Peru State	L 46–55
1942	First round Second Round	Yankton; Central Missouri State	W 44–37; L 40–59
1946	First round	Houston	L 34–63
1964	First round Second Round; Quarterfinals	Ferris State; Georgia Southern; Emporia State	W 86–70; W 85–76; L 78–90
1965	First round Second Round	California Western; Winston–Salem State	W 79–57; L 62–78
1969	First round Second Round; Quarterfinals	Missouri–Saint Louis; Whittier; Eastern New Mexico	W 102–90; W 100–82; L 73–77
1979	First round Second Round	Oregon Tech; Briar Cliff	W 91–62; L 65–76
