= Qubein Center =

Basketball arena in North Carolina, USA

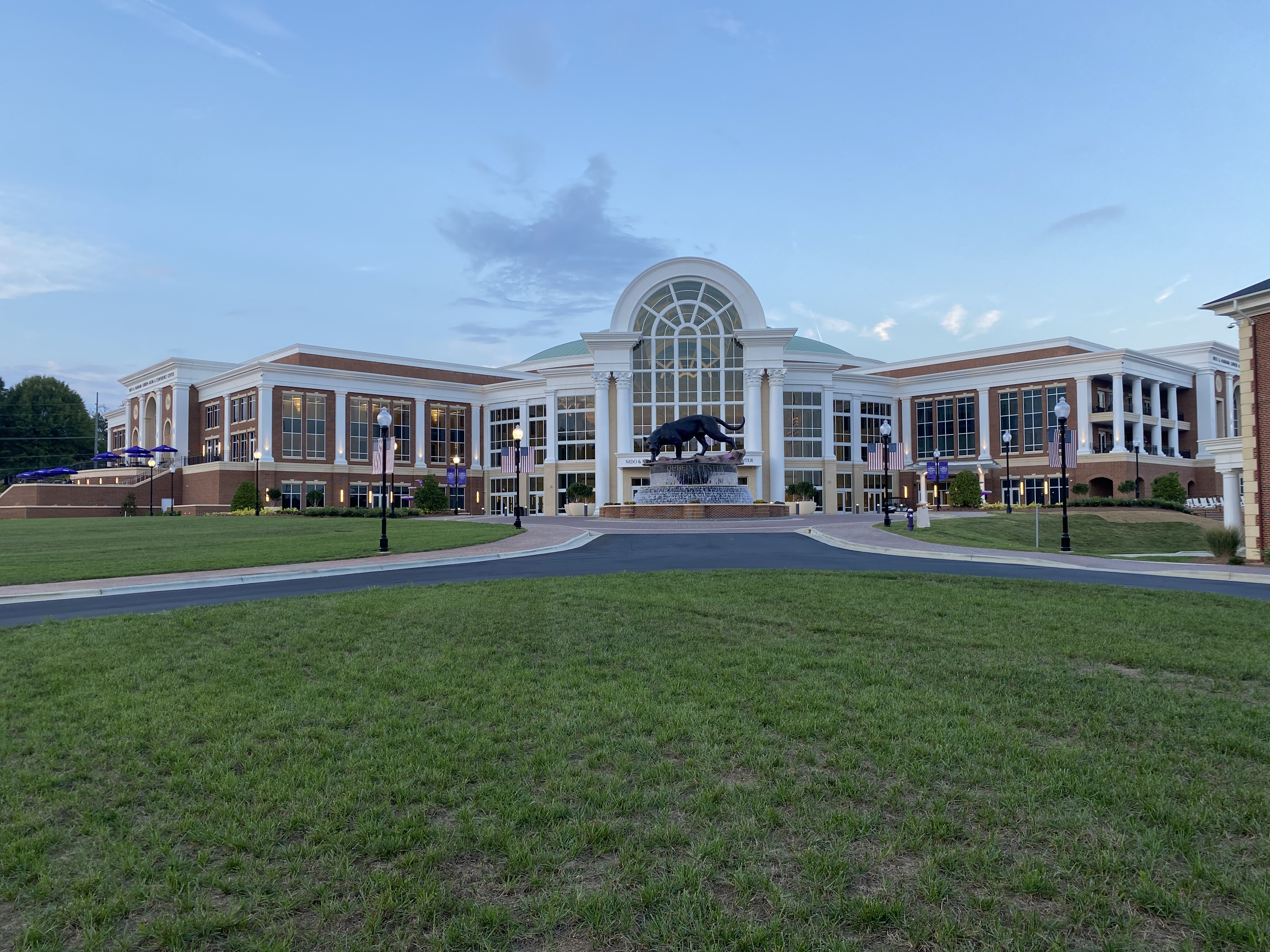
- Exterior view of Qubein Center in 2021
- Interactive map of Qubein Center
- Full name: Nido and Mariana Qubein Arena
- Address: 1050 Panther Drive; High Point, NC; United States
- Coordinates: 35°58′42″N 79°59′48″W
- Owner: High Point University
- Operator: HPU Athletics
- Capacity: 4,500 (5,000 including suites)
- Type: Arena
- Surface: Hardwood
- Current use: Basketball

Construction
- Groundbreaking: September 22, 2018
- Opened: September 24, 2021
- Cost: $170 million
- Architects: CJMW Architecture, Perkins&Will
- General contractors: Samet Corporation & Christman Company

Tenants
- High Point Panthers teams: men's and women's basketball; (2021-present)

Website
- highpoint.edu/arena

Qubein Center is the home of the High Point Panthers basketball programs, both men and women's. It is a 4,500-seat arena located on the campus of the High Point University in High Point, North Carolina. Qubein Center, named for university president Nido Qubein and his spouse Mariana Qubein, is part of the much larger conference center and hotel. The arena held its first games on November 4, 2021; they also held a ceremony that night to commemorate the court, which is named after High Point alumnus Tubby Smith and Donna Smith.

== See also ==
- List of NCAA Division I basketball arenas
