= Darris Nichols =

American basketball coach (born 1986)

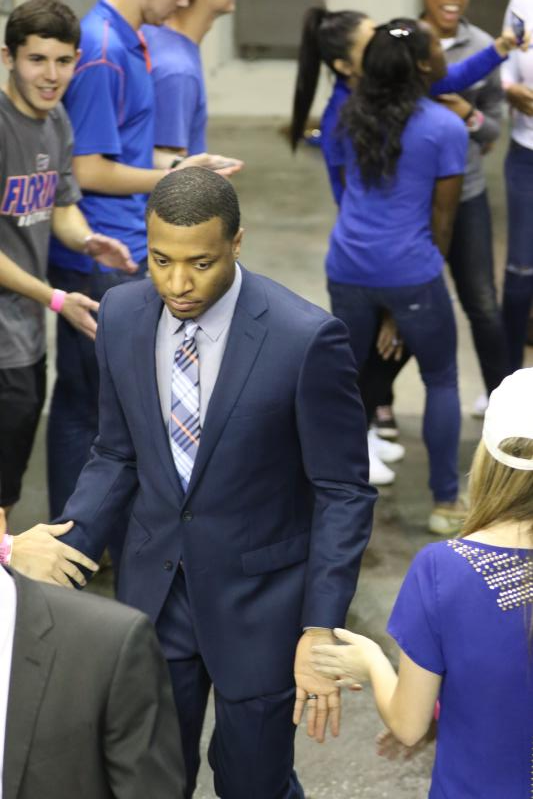
- Nichols in 2016

La Salle Explorers
- Title: Head coach
- League: Atlantic 10 Conference

Personal information
- Born: May 20, 1986 (age 40) Radford, Virginia, U.S.
- Listed height: 6 ft 2 in (1.88 m)
- Listed weight: 200 lb (91 kg)

Career information
- High school: Radford (Radford, Virginia)
- College: West Virginia (2004–2008)
- NBA draft: 2008: undrafted
- Playing career: 2008–2009
- Position: Point guard
- Number: 14
- Coaching career: 2010–present

Career history

Playing
- 2008–2009: Atomerőmű SE

Coaching
- 2010–2011: West Virginia (graduate assistant)
- 2011–2013: Northern Kentucky (assistant)
- 2013–2014: Wofford (assistant)
- 2014–2015: Louisiana Tech (assistant)
- 2015–2021: Florida (assistant)
- 2021–2025: Radford
- 2025–present: La Salle

Darris Nichols (born May 20, 1986) is an American basketball coach and former player who is currently the head coach at La Salle University, a role he has held since 2025. He was previously the head coach at Radford University.

== Playing career ==
=== College ===
Nichols played college basketball at West Virginia, where he was a four-year letterman who played in 144 games during his four-year career.

=== Professional ===
After going undrafted out of college, Nichols went on to play professionally for Atomerőmű SE, a professional team in Hungary for one season that went 10-1 and won the Hungarian cup before suffering a knee injury that ended his playing career.

== Coaching career ==
After one season playing professionally overseas, Nichols turned to his former college coach Bob Huggins to begin a coaching career, starting at his alma mater West Virginia as a graduate assistant. He was named an assistant at Northern Kentucky in 2011 and spent two seasons with the team before spending a season each with Wofford and Louisiana Tech. He joined the coaching staff at Florida in 2015 as an assistant on former Louisiana Tech head coach Mike White's staff.

=== Radford ===
Nichols was named the head coach at Radford on April 21, 2021.

In year two, Radford went 21-15, finishing tied for second in the Big South Conference and advanced to post-season play, participating in the CBI Tournament. Radford had a 9 game winning streak in league play.

=== La Salle ===
La Salle hired Nichols as their new head coach on March 11, 2025, replacing the retiring Fran Dunphy.

== Personal life ==
In February 2023, Nichols was arrested and ultimately pled guilty to DUI. Nichols was suspended for several games at Radford but returned to coaching a few weeks later.

== Head coaching record ==
Record table
Season	Team	Overall	Conference	Standing	Postseason
Radford Highlanders (Big South Conference) (2021–2025)
2021–22	Radford	11–18	7–9	T–3rd (North)	
2022–23	Radford	21–15	12–6	T–2nd	CBI Semifinals
2023–24	Radford	16–17	5–11	T–8th	
2024–25	Radford	20–13	9–7	4th	
Radford:		68–63 (.519)	33–33 (.500)		
La Salle Explorers (Atlantic 10 Conference) (2025–present)
2025–26	La Salle	9–23	5–13	T–11th	
2026–27	La Salle	1–2	0–0		
La Salle:		10–25 (.286)	5–13 (.278)		
Total:		78–88 (.470)			
National champion Postseason invitational champion Conference regular season champion Conference regular season and conference tournament champion Division regular season champion Division regular season and conference tournament champion Conference tournament champion
