= Dave Dickerson =

American basketball coach (born 1967)

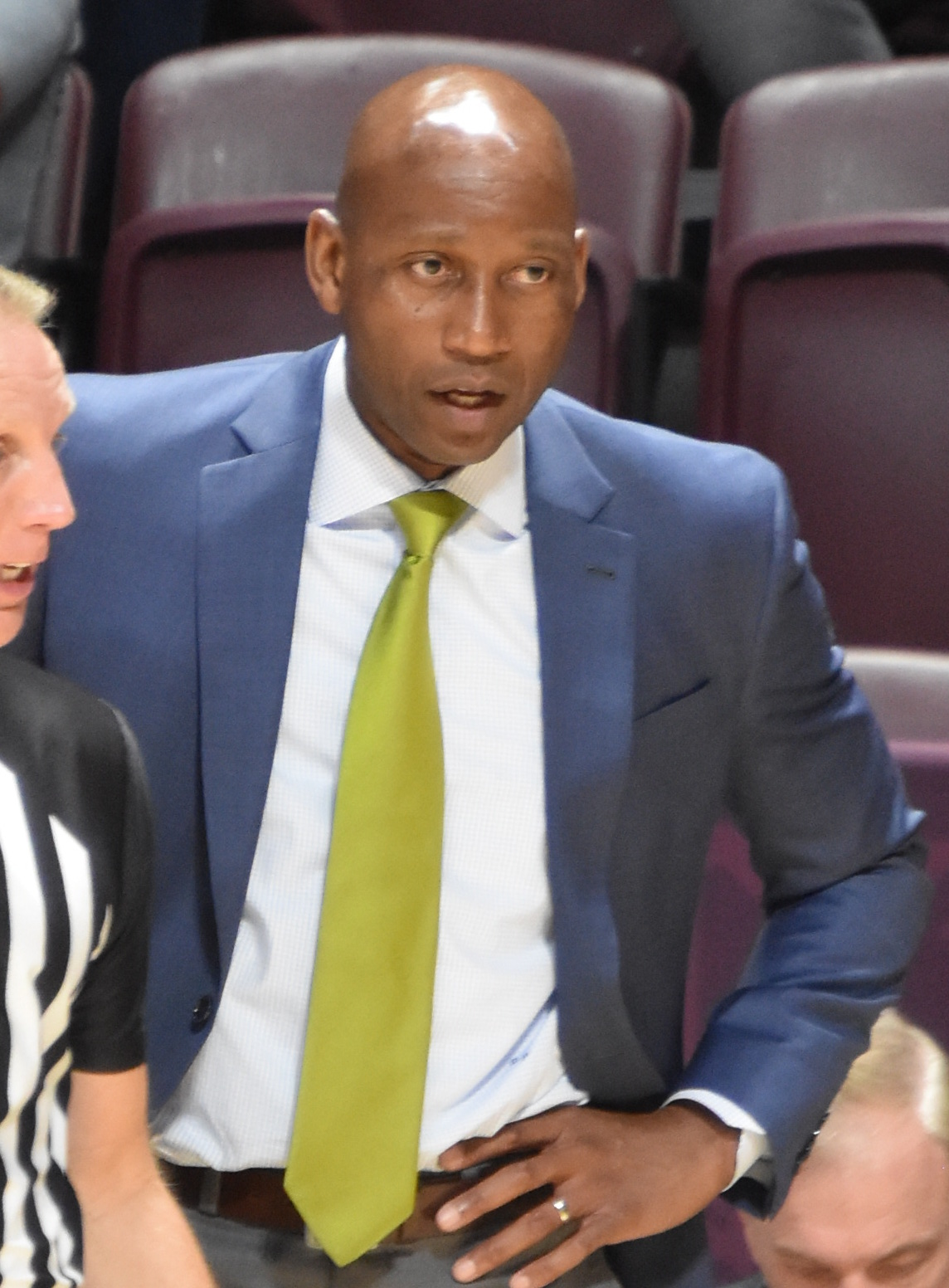

Current position
- Title: Assistant head coach
- Team: Ohio State
- Conference: Big Ten

Biographical details
- Born: March 29, 1967 (age 59); Olar, South Carolina, U.S.

Playing career
- 1985–1989: Maryland
- Position: Small forward

Coaching career (HC unless noted)
- 1990–1991: Gardner–Webb (assistant)
- 1991–1992: James Madison (assistant)
- 1992–1996: Radford (assistant)
- 1996–2005: Maryland (assistant)
- 2005–2010: Tulane
- 2010–2017: Ohio State (associate HC)
- 2018–2024: USC Upstate
- 2024–present: Ohio State (assistant)

Head coaching record
- Overall: 133–201 (.398)
- Tournaments: 1–1 (TBC); 0–1 (CBI)

Dave Dickerson Jr. (born March 29, 1967) is an American college basketball coach, currently as an assistant coach at Ohio State. He previously served as the head men's basketball coach at Tulane and USC Upstate.

== Head coaching record ==
Record table
Season	Team	Overall	Conference	Standing	Postseason
Tulane Green Wave (Conference USA) (2005–2010)
2005–06	Tulane	12–17	6–8	T–6th	
2006–07	Tulane	17–13	9–7	T–4th	
2007–08	Tulane	17–15	6–10	T–7th	
2008–09	Tulane	14–17	7–9	T–6th	
2009–10	Tulane	8–21	3–13	11th	
Tulane:		68–84 (.447)	31–47 (.397)		
USC Upstate Spartans (Big South Conference) (2018–2024)
2018–19	USC Upstate	6–26	1–15	11th	
2019–20	USC Upstate	13–20	7–11	T–7th	
2020–21	USC Upstate	5–18	5–11	9th	
2021–22	USC Upstate	15–17	10–6	3rd (South)	TBC Second Round
2022–23	USC Upstate	16–16	10–8	T–4th	CBI First Round
2023–24	USC Upstate	10–20	5–11	T–8th	
USC Upstate:		65–117 (.357)	38–62 (.380)		
Total:		133–201 (.398)			
