= 2022–23 UNC Asheville Bulldogs men's basketball team =

American college basketball season

2022–23 UNC Asheville Bulldogs men's basketball
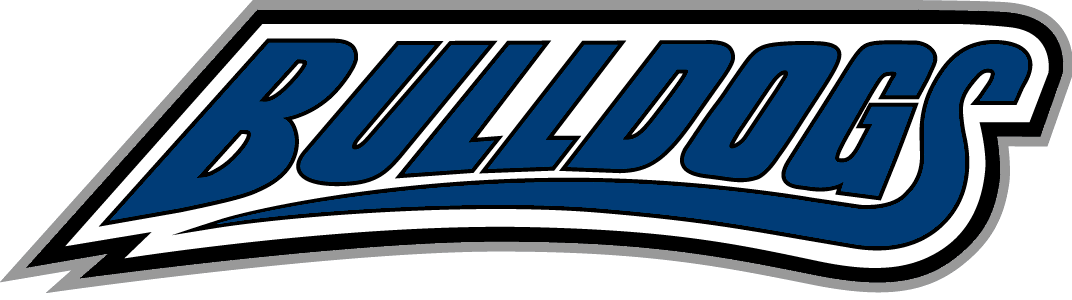

Big South regular season and tournament champions

NCAA tournament, First Round
- Conference: Big South Conference
- Record: 27–8 (16–2 Big South)
- Head coach: Mike Morrell (5th season)
- Assistant coaches: Neil Dixon; Woody Taylor; Justin Levine
- Home arena: Kimmel Arena

2022–23 Big South men's basketball standings
	Conf.				Overall
Team	W		L	PCT	W		L	PCT
UNC Asheville †	16	–	2	.889	27	–	8	.771
Longwood	12	–	6	.667	20	–	12	.625
Radford	12	–	6	.667	21	–	15	.583
USC Upstate	10	–	8	.556	16	–	16	.500
Gardner–Webb	10	–	8	.556	15	–	16	.484
Winthrop	10	–	8	.556	15	–	17	.469
Campbell	8	–	10	.444	16	–	18	.471
High Point	6	–	12	.333	14	–	17	.452
Charleston Southern	5	–	13	.278	10	–	21	.323
Presbyterian	1	–	17	.056	5	–	27	.156
† 2023 Big South tournament winner

The 2022–23 UNC Asheville Bulldogs men's basketball team represented the University of North Carolina at Asheville in the 2022–23 NCAA Division I men's basketball season. The Bulldogs, who were led by fifth-year head coach Mike Morrell, played their home games at Kimmel Arena in Asheville, North Carolina, as members of the Big South Conference. They finished the season 27-7, 16–2 in Big South play to finish in first place, and defeated Charleston Southern, USC Upstate, and Campbell to claim the Big South tournament title. As tournament champions, they received the conference's automatic bid to the NCAA tournament, where they were eliminated in the first round by UCLA.

== Previous season ==
With the reintroduction of divisions for the first time since the 2013–14 season, the Bulldogs played in the South division. They finished the regular season 16–13, 8–8 in Big South play which resulted in a fourth place in the South division. As the No. 5 seed in the Big South tournament, they lost to Charleston Southern in the first round.

The Bulldogs participated in the College Basketball Invitational as a No. 13 seed, where they defeated No. 4 Stephen F. Austin in the first round before losing to No. 12 Northern Colorado in the quarterfinals.

== Roster ==
2022–23 UNC Asheville Bulldogs men's basketball team
Players
Coaches

Pos.	#	Name	Height	Weight	Year	Hometown
G	0	Trent Stephney	6 ft 2 in (1.88 m)	173 lb (78 kg)	Sr	Knoxville, Tennessee
F	1	Jamon Battle	6 ft 5 in (1.96 m)	207 lb (94 kg)	Sr	Richmond, Virginia
G	2	Caleb Burgess	6 ft 3 in (1.91 m)	185 lb (84 kg)	Sr	Winston-Salem, North Carolina
G	3	Tajion Jones	6 ft 5 in (1.96 m)	210 lb (95 kg)	GS	Oak Ridge, Tennessee
F	4	Drew Pember	6 ft 10 in (2.08 m)	212 lb (96 kg)	Sr	Knoxville, Tennessee
F	5	Silas Mason	6 ft 7 in (2.01 m)	192 lb (87 kg)	Jr	Greensboro, North Carolina
G	10	Alex Caldwell	6 ft 0 in (1.83 m)	161 lb (73 kg)	Sr	Columbia, South Carolina
G	11	Zaharee Maddox	5 ft 10 in (1.78 m)	160 lb (73 kg)	Fr	Mocksville, North Carolina
G	12	Fletcher Abee	6 ft 3 in (1.91 m)	195 lb (88 kg)	Jr	Morganton, North Carolina
F	13	Nick McMullen	6 ft 8 in (2.03 m)	237 lb (108 kg)	Jr	Greensboro, North Carolina
F	14	Amadou Sylla	6 ft 10 in (2.08 m)	225 lb (102 kg)	Sr	Bamako, Mali
G	15	Dean Gabrelcik	6 ft 4 in (1.93 m)	213 lb (97 kg)	RS Fr	East Lake, Florida
G	21	Justin Stephens	6 ft 1 in (1.85 m)	170 lb (77 kg)	Jr	Clayton, North Carolina
G	23	Davion Cunningham	6 ft 3 in (1.91 m)	165 lb (75 kg)	Fr	Huntersville, North Carolina
F	25	Ian Clinkscales-King	6 ft 5 in (1.96 m)	225 lb (102 kg)	Fr	Asheville, North Carolina

Head coach

- Mike Morrell (Milligan)

Assistant coach(es)

- Neil Dixon (West Virginia)
- Woody Taylor (Eckerd)
- Justin Levine (Ithaca)

Legend

- (C) Team captain
- (S) Suspended
- (I) Ineligible
- (W) Walk-on
- Injured
- Current redshirt

Roster
Last update: January 6, 2023

== Schedule and results ==
Date time, TV	Rank^{#}	Opponent^{#}	Result	Record	Site (attendance) city, state
Exhibition
November 1, 2022*; 6:30 p.m., ESPN+		Milligan	W 101–47	–	Kimmel Arena (513); Asheville, NC
Non-conference regular season
November 7, 2022*; 8:00 pm, ESPN+		at UCF	W 98–95 ^{2OT}	1–0	Addition Financial Arena (4,603); Orlando, FL
November 12, 2022*; 3:00 pm, ESPN+		Brevard	W 94–46	2–0	Kimmel Arena (815); Asheville, NC
November 18, 2022*; 8:30 pm, ESPN+		vs. Texas A&M–Commerce; Capitol Classic	W 72–64	3–0	GSU Convocation Center (630); Atlanta, GA
November 19, 2022*; 5:30 pm		vs. Eastern Kentucky; Capitol Classic	L 75–77	3–1	GSU Convocation Center (593); Atlanta, GA
November 20, 2022*; 3:30 pm, ESPN+		at Georgia State; Capitol Classic	L 68–74	3–2	GSU Convocation Center (1,331); Atlanta, GA
November 26, 2022*; 2:00 pm, ESPN+/CW62		Western Carolina	W 73–61	4–2	Kimmel Arena (1,522); Asheville, NC
November 29, 2022*; 4:30 pm, NCCUSN		at North Carolina Central	L 66–79	4–3	McDougald–McLendon Arena (1,663); Durham, NC
December 3, 2022*; 2:00 pm, ESPN+/CW62		UT Martin	W 90–83	5–3	Kimmel Arena (908); Asheville, NC
December 7, 2022*; 4:30 pm, ESPN+		Warren Wilson	W 122–70	6–3	Kimmel Arena (925); Asheville, NC
December 10, 2022*; 2:00 pm, USA		at Dayton	L 56–79	6–4	UD Arena (13,407); Dayton, OH
December 13, 2022*; 7:00 pm		at South Carolina State	W 94–84	7–4	SHM Memorial Center (505); Orangeburg, SC
December 17, 2022*; 4:00 pm, ESPN+		at East Tennessee State	W 74–73	8–4	Freedom Hall Civic Center (1,041); Johnson City, TN
December 21, 2022*; 9:00 pm, SECN		at No. 10 Arkansas	L 51–85	8–5	Bud Walton Arena (19,200); Fayetteville, AR
Big South regular season
December 29, 2022; 4:00 pm, ESPN+		Radford	W 62–58	9–5 (1–0)	Kimmel Arena (1,147); Asheville, NC
December 31, 2022; 2:00 pm, ESPN+		at Winthrop	L 60–62	9–6 (1–1)	Winthrop Coliseum (1,134); Rock Hill, SC
January 4, 2023; 7:00 pm, ESPN+		at High Point	W 76–72	10–6 (2–1)	Qubein Center (2,021); High Point, NC
January 7, 2023; 2:00 pm, ESPN+		Campbell	W 58–55	11–6 (3–1)	Kimmel Arena (1,238); Asheville, NC
January 11, 2023; 6:30 pm, ESPNU		Longwood	W 54–46	12–6 (4–1)	Kimmel Arena (1,164); Asheville, NC
January 14, 2023; 6:30 pm, ESPN+		at Gardner–Webb	W 72–67 ^{OT}	13–6 (5–1)	Paul Porter Arena (777); Boiling Springs, NC
January 18, 2023; 7:00 pm, ESPN+		at Charleston Southern	W 73–63	14–6 (6–1)	Buccaneer Field House (797); North Charleston, SC
January 21, 2023; 2:00 pm, ESPN+		USC Upstate	W 64–58	15–6 (7–1)	Kimmel Arena (1,789); Asheville, NC
January 25, 2023; 6:30 pm, ESPN+		Presbyterian	W 88–80 ^{OT}	16–6 (8–1)	Kimmel Arena (1,025); Asheville, NC
January 28, 2023; 2:00 pm, ESPN+		at Campbell	W 78–65	17–6 (9–1)	Gore Arena (1,603); Buies Creek, NC
February 2, 2023; 7:00pm, ESPNU		High Point	W 89–63	18–6 (10–1)	Kimmel Arena (2,288); Asheville, NC
February 4, 2023; 3:00 pm, ESPN+		at USC Upstate	L 70–76	18–7 (10–2)	G. B. Hodge Center (612); Spartanburg, SC
February 8, 2023; 6:30 pm, ESPN+		Winthrop	W 86–79	19–7 (11–2)	Kimmel Arena (2,016); Asheville, NC
February 11, 2023; 2:00 pm, ESPN+		at Presbyterian	W 76–72	20–7 (12–2)	Templeton Physical Education Center (359); Clinton, SC
February 15, 2023; 7:00 pm, ESPN+		at Radford	W 63–54	21–7 (13–2)	Dedmon Center (1,891); Radford, VA
February 18, 2023; 3:00 pm, ESPN+/CW62		Gardner–Webb	W 75–63	22–7 (14–2)	Kimmel Arena (2,957); Asheville, NC
February 22, 2023; 6:30 pm, ESPN+		Charleston Southern	W 80–62	23–7 (15–2)	Kimmel Arena (1,362); Asheville, NC
February 25, 2023; 2:00 pm, ESPN+		at Longwood	W 76–66	24–7 (16–2)	Willett Hall (1,900); Farmville, VA
Big South tournament
March 3, 2023; 12:00 pm, ESPN+	(1)	vs. (9) Charleston Southern; Quarterfinals	W 75–66	25–7	Bojangles Coliseum; Charlotte, NC
March 4, 2023; 12:00 pm, ESPN+	(1)	vs. (4) USC Upstate; Semifinals	W 66–62	26–7	Bojangles Coliseum; Charlotte, NC
March 5, 2023; 1:00 pm, ESPN2	(1)	vs. (7) Campbell; Championship	W 77–73	27–7	Bojangles Coliseum; Charlotte, NC
NCAA Tournament
March 16, 2023; 10:05 p.m., truTV	(15 S)	vs. (2 S) No. 7 UCLA; First Round	L 53–86	27–8	Golden 1 Center (14,527); Sacramento, CA
*Non-conference game. ^{#}Rankings from AP Poll. (#) Tournament seedings in parentheses. All times are in Eastern.
