= 2022–23 Presbyterian Blue Hose men's basketball team =

American college basketball season

2022–23 Presbyterian Blue Hose men's basketball
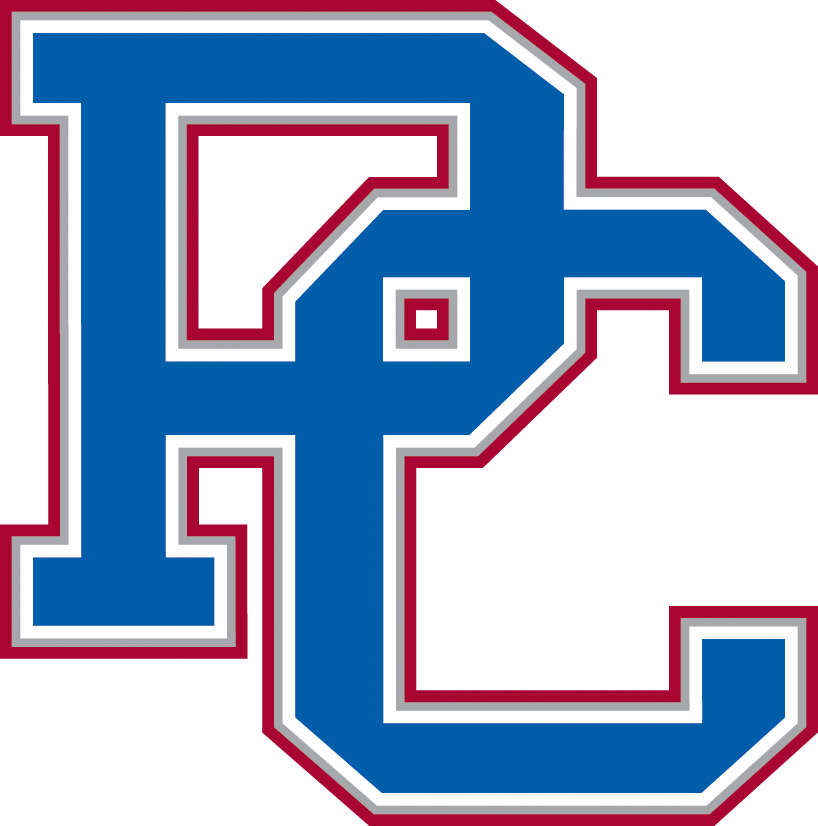
- Conference: Big South Conference
- Record: 5–27 (1–17 Big South)
- Head coach: Quinton Ferrell (4th season)
- Assistant coaches: Nick Lagroone; Justin Griffith; Donovan Williams
- Home arena: Templeton Physical Education Center

2022–23 Big South men's basketball standings
	Conf.				Overall
Team	W		L	PCT	W		L	PCT
UNC Asheville †	16	–	2	.889	27	–	8	.771
Longwood	12	–	6	.667	20	–	12	.625
Radford	12	–	6	.667	21	–	15	.583
USC Upstate	10	–	8	.556	16	–	16	.500
Gardner–Webb	10	–	8	.556	15	–	16	.484
Winthrop	10	–	8	.556	15	–	17	.469
Campbell	8	–	10	.444	16	–	18	.471
High Point	6	–	12	.333	14	–	17	.452
Charleston Southern	5	–	13	.278	10	–	21	.323
Presbyterian	1	–	17	.056	5	–	27	.156
† 2023 Big South tournament winner

The 2022–23 Presbyterian Blue Hose men's basketball team represented Presbyterian College in the 2022–23 NCAA Division I men's basketball season. The Blue Hose, led by fourth-year head coach Quinton Ferrell, played their home games at the Templeton Physical Education Center in Clinton, South Carolina as members of the Big South Conference.

== Previous season ==
The Blue Hose finished the 2021–22 season 12–20, 4–12 in Big South play, to finish in fifth place in the South division. They were defeated by Campbell in the first round of the Big South tournament.

== Roster ==
2022–23 Presbyterian Blue Hose men's basketball team
Players
Coaches

Pos.	#	Name	Height	Weight	Year	Hometown
G	0	Crosby James	6 ft 0 in (1.83 m)	185 lb (84 kg)	Jr	Columbia, SC
G	1	Marquis Barnett	6 ft 4 in (1.93 m)	195 lb (88 kg)	So	Saginaw, MI
G	2	Jalen Forrest	6 ft 4 in (1.93 m)	230 lb (104 kg)	Fr	Decatur, GA
G/F	3	Kobe Stewart	6 ft 6 in (1.98 m)	180 lb (82 kg)	Jr	Augusta, GA
F	4	Winston Hill	6 ft 7 in (2.01 m)	230 lb (104 kg)	Sr	Columbia, SC
G	5	Houston Jones	6 ft 4 in (1.93 m)	185 lb (84 kg)	Fr	Lexington, SC
G	10	James Lovorn	6 ft 0 in (1.83 m)	175 lb (79 kg)	So	Anderson, SC
G	11	Quadir Pettaway	6 ft 1 in (1.85 m)	170 lb (77 kg)	Fr	Newport News, VA
G	12	AJ Cook	6 ft 0 in (1.83 m)	150 lb (68 kg)	Fr	Matthews, NC
F	13	Terrell Jr. Ard	6 ft 7 in (2.01 m)	220 lb (100 kg)	RS So	Marietta, GA
F	14	Jaylen Peterson	6 ft 7 in (2.01 m)	190 lb (86 kg)	Fr	Stone Mountain, GA
F	15	Owen McCormack	6 ft 9 in (2.06 m)	230 lb (104 kg)	Sr	Advance, NC
F/C	21	Porter Stanley	6 ft 10 in (2.08 m)	220 lb (100 kg)	RS Fr	Columbia, SC
G	23	Trevon Reddish-Rhone	6 ft 4 in (1.93 m)	205 lb (93 kg)	Sr	Carrollton, GA
F	33	Jack McMahon	6 ft 3 in (1.91 m)	215 lb (98 kg)	Sr	Hickory, NC

Head coach

- Quinton Ferrell (Presbyterian)

Assistant coach(es)

- Nick Lagroone (Southern Wesleyan)
- Justin Griffith (North Carolina Wesleyan)
- Donovan Williams (Park)

Legend

- (C) Team captain
- (S) Suspended
- (I) Ineligible
- (W) Walk-on
- Injured
- Current redshirt

Roster
Last update: November 22, 2022

== Schedule and results ==
Date time, TV	Rank^{#}	Opponent^{#}	Result	Record	Site (attendance) city, state
Non-conference regular season
November 7, 2022*; 7:00 p.m., ESPN+		Carolina	W 76–42	1–0	Templeton Physical Education Center (520); Clinton, SC
November 10, 2022*; 7:00 p.m., ESPN+		at The Citadel	L 58–70	1–1	McAlister Field House (1,035); Charleston, SC
November 12, 2022*; 4:00 p.m., ESPN+		at East Carolina	L 57–77	1–2	Williams Arena (3,726); Greenville, NC
November 16, 2022*; 7:30 p.m., CUSA.tv		at UAB; Sunshine Slam campus-site game	L 61–92	1–3	Bartow Arena (3,396); Birmingham, AL
November 21, 2022*; 2:00 p.m., FloHoops		vs. Bucknell; Sunshine Slam semifinals	L 65–66	1–4	Ocean Center; Daytona Beach, FL
November 22, 2022*; 8:30 p.m., FloHoops		vs. Albany; Sunshine Slam consolation	L 65–68	1–5	Ocean Center (1,417); Daytona Beach, FL
November 26, 2022*; 4:00 p.m., ESPN+		at Charlotte	L 42–69	1–6	Dale F. Halton Arena (2,104); Charlotte, NC
November 29, 2022*; 7:00 p.m., ESPN+		VMI	W 72–57	2–6	Templeton Physical Education Center (380); Clinton, SC
December 1, 2022*; 7:00 p.m., ESPN+		at Wofford	L 63–76	2–7	Jerry Richardson Indoor Stadium (906); Spartanburg, SC
December 6, 2022*; 7:00 p.m., ESPN+		College of Charleston	L 62–67	2–8	Templeton Physical Education Center (573); Clinton, SC
December 11, 2022*; 6:00 p.m., SECN+/ESPN+		at South Carolina	L 57–68	2–9	Colonial Life Arena (9,276); Columbia, SC
December 15, 2022*; 12:00 p.m., ESPN+		Elon	W 69–63	3–9	Templeton Physical Education Center (645); Clinton, SC
December 19, 2022*; 7:00 p.m., ESPN+		Allen	W 90–70	4–9	Templeton Physical Education Center (304); Clinton, SC
Big South Conference regular season
December 29, 2022; 5:00 p.m., ESPN+		Campbell	W 82–72	5–9 (1–0)	Templeton Physical Education Center (400); Clinton, SC
December 31, 2022; 2:00 p.m., ESPN+		at Radford	L 51–69	5–10 (1–1)	Dedmon Center (1,001); Radford, VA
January 4, 2023; 7:00 p.m., ESPN+		at Winthrop	L 72–82	5–11 (1–2)	Winthrop Coliseum (1,066); Rock Hill, SC
January 7, 2023; 2:00 p.m., ESPN+		Charleston Southern	L 61–67	5–12 (1–3)	Templeton Physical Education Center (333); Clinton, SC
January 11, 2023; 7:00 p.m., ESPN+		Gardner–Webb	L 78–79 ^{OT}	5–13 (1–4)	Templeton Physical Education Center (416); Clinton, SC
January 14, 2023; 7:00 p.m., ESPN+		at High Point	L 56–64	5–14 (1–5)	Qubein Center (4,206); High Point, NC
January 18, 2023; 7:00 p.m., ESPN+		at USC Upstate	L 60–61	5–15 (1–6)	G. B. Hodge Center (751); Spartanburg, SC
January 21, 2023; 2:00 p.m., ESPN+		Longwood	L 56–58	5–16 (1–7)	Templeton Physical Education Center (460); Clinton, SC
January 25, 2023; 6:30 p.m., ESPN+		at UNC Asheville	L 80–88 ^{OT}	5–17 (1–8)	Kimmel Arena (1,025); Asheville, NC
January 28, 2023; 2:00 p.m., ESPN3		Winthrop	L 58–76	5–18 (1–9)	Templeton Physical Education Center (431); Clinton, SC
February 1, 2023; 7:00 p.m., ESPN+		Radford	L 59–67	5–19 (1–10)	Templeton Physical Education Center (338); Clinton, SC
February 4, 2023; 2:00 p.m., ESPN+		at Gardner–Webb	L 48–56	5–20 (1–11)	Paul Porter Arena (836); Boiling Springs, NC
February 8, 2023; 7:00 p.m., ESPN+		at Longwood	L 46–66	5–21 (1–12)	Willett Hall (1,413); Farmville, VA
February 11, 2023; 2:00 p.m., ESPN+		UNC Asheville	L 72–76	5–22 (1–13)	Templeton Physical Education Center (359); Clinton, SC
February 15, 2023; 7:00 p.m., ESPN+		High Point	L 69–71	5–23 (1–14)	Templeton Physical Education Center (305); Clinton, SC
February 18, 2023; 2:00 p.m., ESPN+		at Campbell	L 57–74	5–24 (1–15)	Gore Arena (1,843); Buies Creek, NC
February 22, 2023; 7:00 p.m., ESPN+		USC Upstate	L 57–59	5–25 (1–16)	Templeton Physical Education Center (455); Clinton, SC
February 25, 2023; 5:30 p.m., ESPN+		at Charleston Southern	L 59–85	5–26 (1–17)	Buccaneer Field House (777); North Charleston, SC
Big South tournament
March 1, 2022; 8:00 p.m., ESPN+	(10)	vs. (7) Campbell; First round	L 63–68	5–27	Bojangles Coliseum (1,177); Charlotte, NC
*Non-conference game. ^{#}Rankings from AP poll. (#) Tournament seedings in parentheses. All times are in Eastern.
