= 2022–23 Campbell Fighting Camels men's basketball team =

American college basketball season

2022–23 Campbell Fighting Camels men's basketball
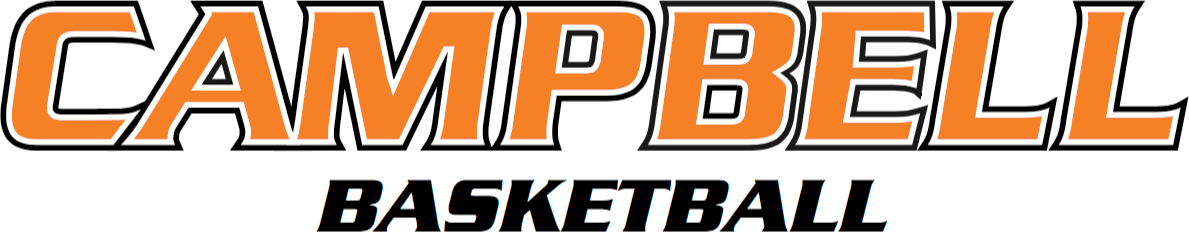
- Conference: Big South Conference
- Record: 16–18 (8–10 Big South)
- Head coach: Kevin McGeehan (10th season)
- Assistant coaches: Chris Long; Monty Sanders; Mike Summey
- Home arena: Gore Arena

2022–23 Big South men's basketball standings
	Conf.				Overall
Team	W		L	PCT	W		L	PCT
UNC Asheville †	16	–	2	.889	27	–	8	.771
Longwood	12	–	6	.667	20	–	12	.625
Radford	12	–	6	.667	21	–	15	.583
USC Upstate	10	–	8	.556	16	–	16	.500
Gardner–Webb	10	–	8	.556	15	–	16	.484
Winthrop	10	–	8	.556	15	–	17	.469
Campbell	8	–	10	.444	16	–	18	.471
High Point	6	–	12	.333	14	–	17	.452
Charleston Southern	5	–	13	.278	10	–	21	.323
Presbyterian	1	–	17	.056	5	–	27	.156
† 2023 Big South tournament winner

The 2022–23 Campbell Fighting Camels men's basketball team represented Campbell University in the 2022–23 NCAA Division I men's basketball season. The Fighting Camels, led by 10th-year head coach Kevin McGeehan, played their home games at Gore Arena in Buies Creek, North Carolina as members of the Big South Conference.

== Previous season ==
The Fighting Camels finished the 2021–22 season 16–13, 8–8 in Big South play to finish in second place in the North Division. In the Big South tournament, they defeated Presbyterian in the first round, before falling to Gardner–Webb in the quarterfinals.

== Roster ==
2022–23 Campbell Fighting Camels men's basketball team
Players
Coaches

Pos.	#	Name	Height	Weight	Year	Hometown
G	0	Gediminas Mokšeckas	6 ft 4 in (1.93 m)	200 lb (91 kg)	Jr	Vilnius, Lithuania
G	1	Ricky Clemons	6 ft 2 in (1.88 m)	210 lb (95 kg)	Sr	Raleigh, North Carolina
G	2	Devon Dunn	6 ft 1 in (1.85 m)	180 lb (82 kg)	Sr	Washington, D.C.
G	4	Broc Bidwell	6 ft 0 in (1.83 m)	170 lb (77 kg)	So	Cumming, Georgia
G	5	Elijah Walsh	6 ft 5 in (1.96 m)	185 lb (84 kg)	Fr	Leeds, England
G/F	10	Mason Grant	6 ft 5 in (1.96 m)	205 lb (93 kg)	RS Fr	North Charleston, South Carolina
G	11	Omar Harris	6 ft 3 in (1.91 m)	180 lb (82 kg)	Fr	Plymouth, North Carolina
F	12	Jesús Carralero	6 ft 8 in (2.03 m)	220 lb (100 kg)	Sr	Málaga, Spain
G	13	Jasin Sinani	6 ft 3 in (1.91 m)	195 lb (88 kg)	So	Oak Creek, Wisconsin
F	15	Jay Pal	6 ft 9 in (2.06 m)	190 lb (86 kg)	Sr	Omaha, Nebraska
G	20	Juan Reyna	6 ft 3 in (1.91 m)	185 lb (84 kg)	So	San Antonio, Texas
F	22	Laurynas Vaistaras	6 ft 6 in (1.98 m)	215 lb (98 kg)	Jr	Plungė, Lithuania
F	23	Joshua Lusane	6 ft 7 in (2.01 m)	240 lb (109 kg)	Sr	Americus, Georgia
C	24	Wesley Johnson	7 ft 0 in (2.13 m)	230 lb (104 kg)	Fr	Raleigh, North Carolina
G	25	Darwin Randolph	6 ft 0 in (1.83 m)	180 lb (82 kg)	So	Chattanooga, Tennessee
G	30	Anthony Dell'Orso	6 ft 6 in (1.98 m)	190 lb (86 kg)	Fr	Melbourne, Australia

Head coach

- Kevin McGeehan (Gettysburg)

Assistant coach(es)

- Chris Long (Elon)
- Monty Sanders (Elon)
- Mike Summey (NC State)

Legend

- (C) Team captain
- (S) Suspended
- (I) Ineligible
- (W) Walk-on
- Injured
- Current redshirt

Roster
Last update: January 6, 2023

== Schedule and results ==
Date time, TV	Rank^{#}	Opponent^{#}	Result	Record	Site (attendance) city, state
Non-conference regular season
November 7, 2022*; 8:00 pm, ESPN+		St. Augustine's	W 79–62	1–0	Gore Arena (1,286); Buies Creek, NC
November 11, 2022*; 7:00 pm, ESPN+/ACCNX		at NC State	L 67–73	1–1	PNC Arena (12,977); Raleigh, NC
November 18, 2022*; 7:00 pm, ESPN+		at Appalachian State; Appalachian State MTE	W 63–58	2–1	Holmes Center (2,856); Boone, NC
November 19, 2022*; 4:00 pm, ESPN+		vs. Southeastern Louisiana; Appalachian State MTE	L 69–70	2–2	Holmes Center (197); Boone, NC
November 20, 2022*; 12:00 pm		Kennesaw State	W 85–61	3–2	Gore Arena (158); Buies Creek, NC
November 23, 2022*; 4:00 pm, ESPN+		Jacksonville	L 43–64	3–3	Gore Arena (1,108); Buies Creek, NC
November 27, 2022*; 1:00 pm, ESPN+		Stetson	W 87–85 ^{OT}	4–3	Gore Arena (1,029); Buies Creek, NC
December 2, 2022*; 4:00 pm, ESPN+		at East Carolina	L 69–79	4–4	Williams Arena (3,833); Greenville, NC
December 7, 2022*; 8:00 pm, ESPN+		at Evansville	L 66–72	4–5	Ford Center (3,824); Evansville, IN
December 14, 2022*; 6:00 pm, ESPN+		William Peace	W 97–58	5–5	Gore Arena (1,033); Buies Creek, NC
December 17, 2022*; 3:00 pm, ESPN+		at Georgia Southern	L 53–54	5–6	Hanner Fieldhouse (573); Statesboro, GA
December 21, 2022*; 2:00 pm, ESPN+		UNC Wilmington	L 66–74	5–7	Gore Arena (1,514); Buies Creek, NC
Big South Conference regular season
December 29, 2022; 5:00 pm, ESPN+		at Presbyterian	L 72–82	5–8 (0–1)	Templeton Physical Education Center (400); Clinton, SC
December 31, 2022; 2:00 pm, ESPN+		Longwood	L 42–67	5–9 (0–2)	Gore Arena (1,132); Buies Creek, NC
January 4, 2023; 7:00 pm, ESPN+		Gardner–Webb	W 63–58	6–9 (1–2)	Gore Arena (921); Buies Creek, NC
January 7, 2023; 2:00 pm, ESPN+		at UNC Asheville	L 55–58	6–10 (1–3)	Kimmel Arena (1,238); Asheville, NC
January 11, 2023; 7:00 pm, ESPN+		at USC Upstate	W 78–63	7–10 (2–3)	G. B. Hodge Center (456); Spartanburg, SC
January 14, 2023; 2:00 pm, ESPN+		Winthrop	L 74–78	7–11 (2–4)	Gore Arena (1,638); Buies Creek, NC
January 18, 2023; 7:00 pm, ESPN+		Radford	L 55–63	7–12 (2–5)	Gore Arena (1,466); Buies Creek, NC
January 21, 2023; 5:30 pm, ESPN+		at Charleston Southern	W 78–76 ^{OT}	8–12 (3–5)	Buccaneer Field House (875); North Charleston, SC
January 25, 2023; 7:00 pm, ESPN+		at High Point	W 72–64	9–12 (4–5)	Qubein Center (2,577); High Point, NC
January 28, 2023; 2:00 pm, ESPN+		UNC Asheville	L 65–78	9–13 (4–6)	Gore Arena (1,603); Buies Creek, NC
February 1, 2023; 2:00 pm, ESPN+		USC Upstate	W 78–66	10–13 (5–6)	Gore Arena (1,153); Buies Creek, NC
February 4, 2023; 2:00 pm, ESPN+		at Longwood	L 50–75	10–14 (5–7)	Willett Hall (1,638); Farmville, VA
February 8, 2023; 7:00 pm, ESPN+		High Point	W 82–66	11–14 (6–7)	Gore Arena (1,416); Buies Creek, NC
February 11, 2023; 2:00 pm, ESPN3		at Gardner-Webb	L 73–77	11–15 (6–8)	Paul Porter Arena (1,174); Boiling Springs, NC
February 15, 2023; 7:00 pm, ESPN+		Charleston Southern	W 67–51	12–15 (7–8)	Gore Arena (1,097); Buies Creek, NC
February 18, 2023; 2:00 pm, ESPN+		Presbyterian	W 74–57	13–15 (8–8)	Gore Arena (1,843); Buies Creek, NC
February 22, 2023; 7:00 pm, ESPN+		at Winthrop	L 93–95 ^{OT}	13–16 (8–9)	Winthrop Coliseum (1,101); Rock Hill, SC
February 25, 2023; 2:00 pm, ESPN+		at Radford	L 65–67	13–17 (8–10)	Dedmon Center (1,484); Radford, VA
Big South tournament
March 1, 2023; 8:00 pm, ESPN+	(7)	vs. (10) Presbyterian; First round	W 68–63	14–17	Bojangles Coliseum (1,177); Charlotte, NC
March 3, 2023; 6:00 pm, ESPN+	(7)	vs. (2) Longwood; Quarterfinals	W 81–68	15–17	Bojangles Coliseum; Charlotte, NC
March 4, 2023; 2:00 pm, ESPN+	(7)	vs. (3) Radford; Semifinals	W 72–71	16–17	Bojangles Coliseum; Charlotte, NC
March 5, 2023; 1:00 pm, ESPN+	(7)	vs. (1) UNC Asheville; Championship	L 73–77	16–18	Bojangles Coliseum; Charlotte, NC
*Non-conference game. ^{#}Rankings from AP Poll. (#) Tournament seedings in parentheses. All times are in Eastern.
