= G. G. Smith =

American college basketball coach (born 1977)

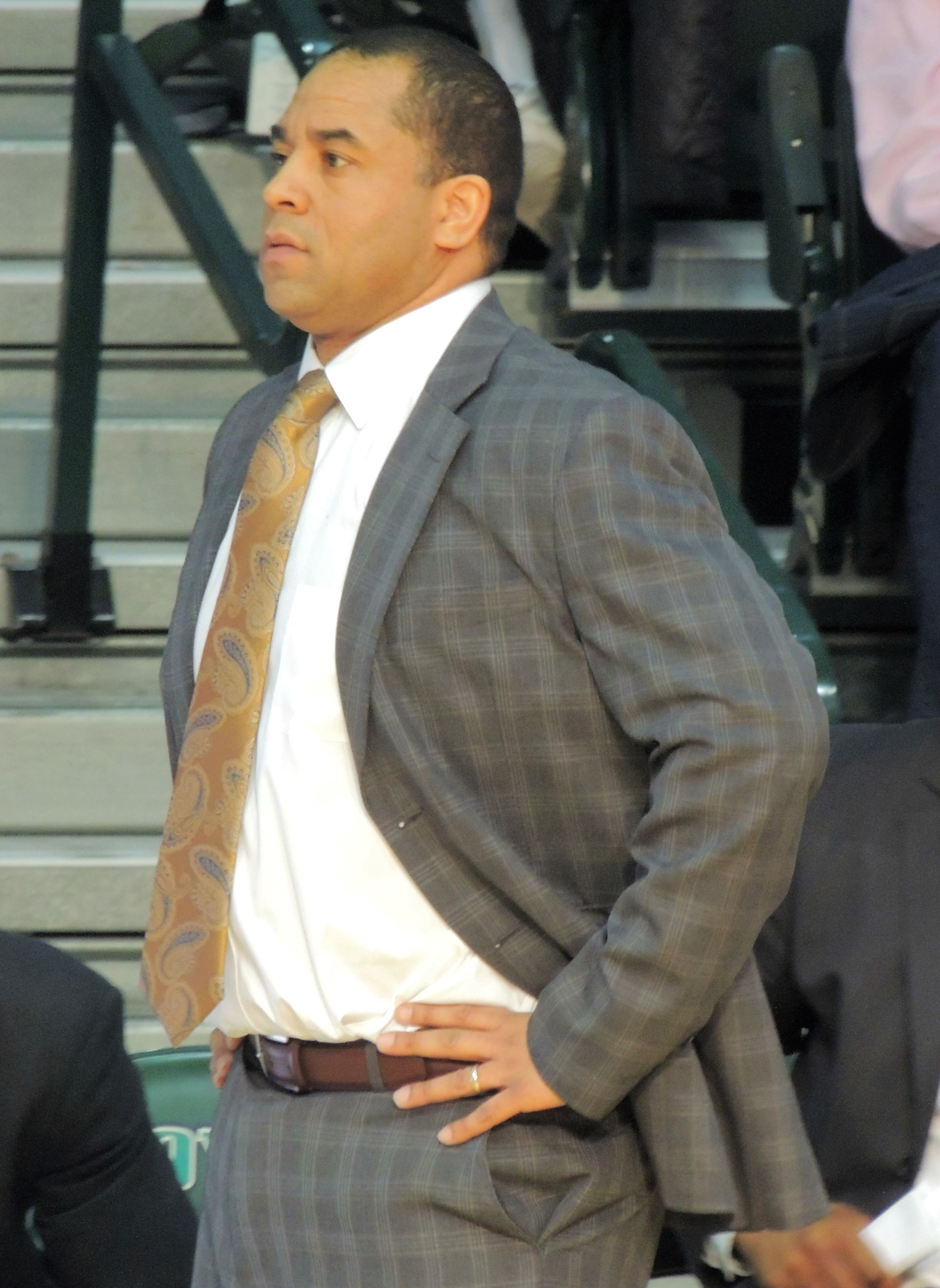
- Smith coaching in 2017

Biographical details
- Born: January 14, 1977 (age 49); Leonardtown, Maryland, U.S.

Playing career
- 1995–1999: Georgia
- Position: Point guard

Coaching career (HC unless noted)
- 1999–2000: Lexington Catholic HS (assistant)
- 2000–2002: Kentucky (GA)
- 2002–2004: Tennessee Tech (assistant)
- 2004–2006: Armstrong Atlantic State (assistant)
- 2006–2007: Johns Hopkins (assistant)
- 2007–2013: Loyola (MD) (assistant)
- 2013–2018: Loyola (MD)
- 2018–2022: High Point (assistant)
- 2022–2023: High Point

Head coaching record
- Overall: 73–118 (.382)

Guffrie Gibson Smith (born January 14, 1977) is an American college basketball coach who was most recently the head coach at High Point University. He was previously the head coach at Loyola University Maryland.

== Early life and college playing career ==
A native of Leonardtown, Maryland, Smith is the oldest son of college basketball coach Tubby Smith. G.G. attended Cascia Hall Preparatory School while his father coached at the University of Tulsa. After graduating from Cascia Hall in 1995, Smith attended the University of Georgia and played basketball for the Georgia Bulldogs under Tubby Smith, who had been hired to coach at Georgia the same year. A point guard, Smith joined the starting lineup as a sophomore and averaged 9.5 points and 2.4 rebounds. He later played his junior and senior seasons under Ron Jirsa. As a senior, Smith averaged 8.5 points and 2.3 rebounds. Smith graduated from Georgia in December 1999 with a degree in health and physical education.

== Coaching career ==
Smith began his coaching career as an assistant coach and teacher at Lexington Catholic High School in Lexington, Kentucky. In the fall of 2000, Smith enrolled at the University of Kentucky for graduate school and joined his father's staff as a graduate assistant. Completing his master's degree in sports management in 2002, Smith became an assistant coach at Tennessee Tech. From 2004 to 2006, Smith was an assistant at Armstrong Atlantic State, then at Johns Hopkins for the 2006–07 season.

After six seasons as an assistant under Jimmy Patsos, Smith succeeded Patsos as head coach at Loyola University Maryland in 2013 after Patsos took the head coaching job at Siena.

On March 8, 2018, Smith announced that he was resigning from Loyola after 5 seasons. He was subsequently hired by his father Tubby Smith as an assistant at High Point. On February 16, 2022, the elder Smith stepped down as coach, making G.G. his replacement. In his first full season, Smith led High Point to a 14-17 record. He was fired on March 3, 2023.

== Head coaching record ==
Record table
Season	Team	Overall	Conference	Standing	Postseason
Loyola Greyhounds (Patriot League) (2013–2018)
2013–14	Loyola	11–19	6–12	7th	
2014–15	Loyola	11–19	7–11	9th	
2015–16	Loyola	9–21	8–10	8th	
2016–17	Loyola	16–17	8–10	T–6th	CBI Quarterfinals
2017–18	Loyola	9–22	6–12	8th	
Loyola:		56–98 (.364)	35–55 (.389)		
High Point Panthers (Big South Conference) (2022–2023)
2021–22	High Point	3–3	2–3	T–3rd (North)	
2022–23	High Point	14–17	6–12	8th	
High Point:		17–20 (.459)	8–15 (.348)		
Total:		73–118 (.382)			
National champion Postseason invitational champion Conference regular season champion Conference regular season and conference tournament champion Division regular season champion Division regular season and conference tournament champion Conference tournament champion
