= Mike Morrell (basketball) =

American basketball player and coach (born 1982)

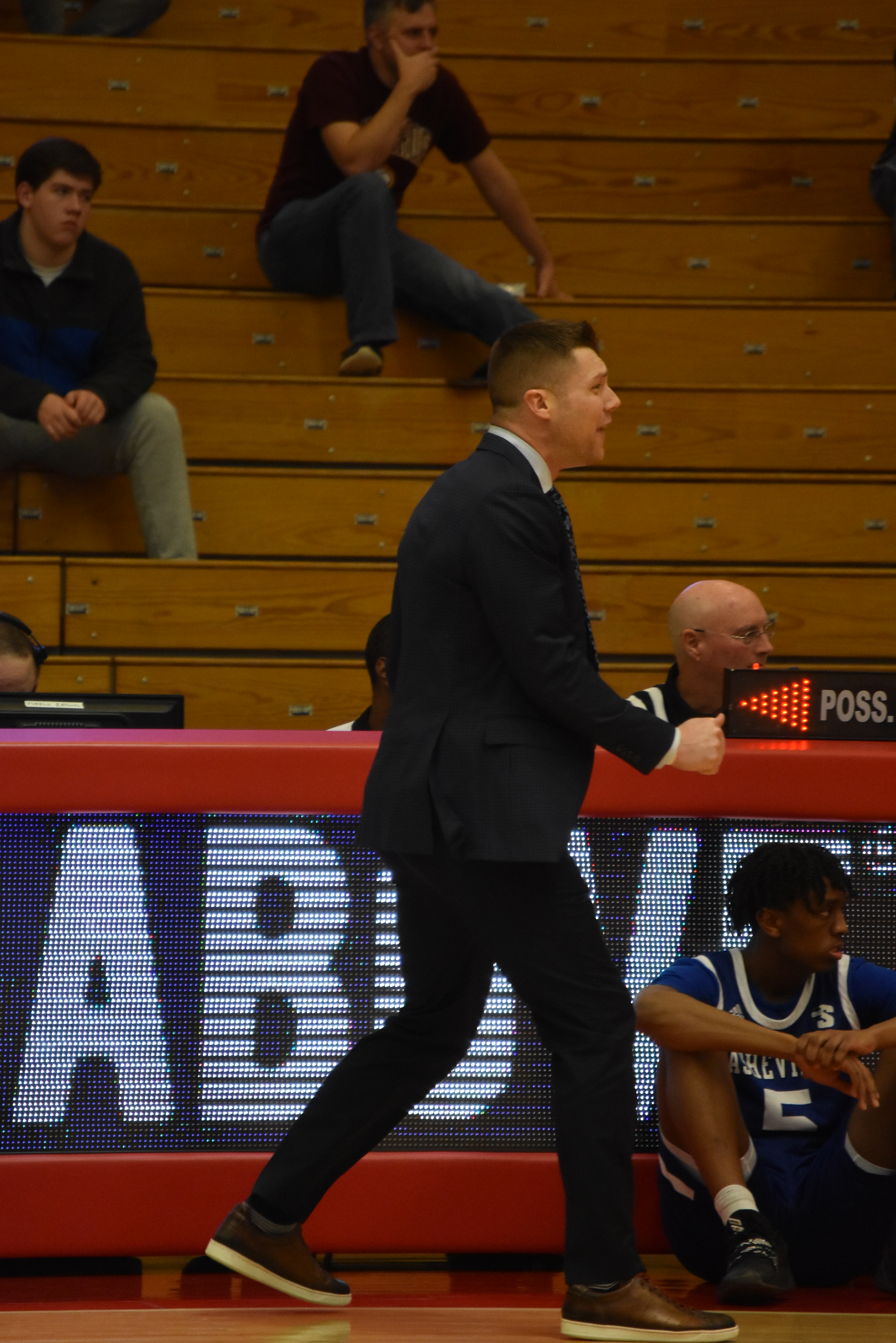

Current position
- Title: Head coach
- Team: UNC Asheville
- Conference: Big South
- Record: 131–116 (.530)

Biographical details
- Born: August 22, 1982 (age 44); Elizabethton, Tennessee, U.S.

Playing career
- 2000–2005: Milligan

Coaching career (HC unless noted)
- 2005–2007: King (assistant)
- 2010–2011: Charleston Southern (assistant)
- 2011–2015: VCU (assistant)
- 2015–2018: Texas (assistant)
- 2018–present: UNC Asheville

Administrative career (AD unless noted)
- 2007–2010: Clemson (dir. of ops.)

Head coaching record
- Overall: 131–116 (.530)
- Tournaments: 0–1 (NCAA Division I); 1–1 (CBI)

Accomplishments and honors

Championships
- Big South tournament (2023); Big South regular season (2023)

Awards
- Big South Coach of the Year (2023)

Mike Morrell (born August 22, 1982) is an American college basketball coach, and current head coach of the UNC Asheville Bulldogs men's basketball team.

== Playing career ==
Morrell was a two-sport athlete at Milligan College playing both basketball and golf. He was a three-year starter and 1,000-point scorer in men's basketball and two-time all-league selection in golf.

Morrell is still listed in the Milligan College men's basketball record books. As a freshman in 2000-01, he led the basketball team in free throw percentage (80.9%). During the 2002-03 season, he led the team in 3 pt field goals made (49) and free throw percentage (82.4%)

== Coaching career ==
After graduation in 2005, Morrell landed his first coaching job at King University for two seasons before joining Oliver Purnell's staff at Clemson as a graduate assistant and director of basketball operations from 2007 to 2010. After a one-year stop at Charleston Southern, Morrell joined Shaka Smart's staff at VCU, and was part of four Rams NCAA Tournament squads. Morrell followed Smart to Texas as an assistant coach and stayed in the position until April 11, 2018 when he was named the seventh head coach in UNC Asheville men's basketball history, replacing Nick McDevitt who departed for Middle Tennessee.

Morrell has coached a number of National Basketball Association players, including 2014 NBA D-League All-star and current Phoenix Suns player Troy Daniels. He also coached 2015 A-10 Tournament MVP and current Charlotte Hornets player Treveon Graham, and three-time A-10 Defensive Player of the Year Brianté Weber, who plays with the Memphis Grizzlies. Most recently, Morrell coached current Atlanta Hawks player Isaiah Taylor, and 2016 McDonald's All-American Jarrett Allen, who was selected 22nd overall in the 2017 NBA Draft by the Brooklyn Nets.

== Head coaching record ==
=== NCAA DI ===
Record table
Season	Team	Overall	Conference	Standing	Postseason
UNC Asheville Bulldogs (Big South Conference) (2018–present)
2018–19	UNC Asheville	4–27	2–14	10th	
2019–20	UNC Asheville	15–16	8–10	T–5th	
2020–21	UNC Asheville	10–10	9–5	4th	
2021–22	UNC Asheville	17–15	8–8	4th (South)	CBI Quarterfinals
2022–23	UNC Asheville	27–8	16–2	1st	NCAA Division I Round of 64
2023–24	UNC Asheville	22–12	14–4	2nd	
2024–25	UNC Asheville	21–11	11–5	2nd	
2025–26	UNC Asheville	15–17	8–8	T–4th	
2026–27	UNC Asheville	0–0	0–0		
UNC Asheville:		131–116 (.530)	76–56 (.576)		
Total:		131–116 (.530)			
National champion Postseason invitational champion Conference regular season champion Conference regular season and conference tournament champion Division regular season champion Division regular season and conference tournament champion Conference tournament champion
