= 2022–23 Radford Highlanders men's basketball team =

American college basketball season

2022–23 Radford Highlanders men's basketball
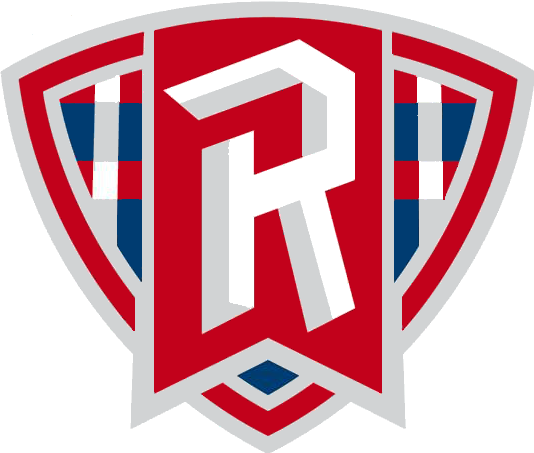

CBI, Semifinals
- Conference: Big South Conference
- Record: 21–15 (12–6 Big South)
- Head coach: Darris Nichols (2nd season)
- Assistant coaches: Shane Nichols; Timothy Peete; James Haring
- Home arena: Dedmon Center

2022–23 Big South men's basketball standings
	Conf.				Overall
Team	W		L	PCT	W		L	PCT
UNC Asheville †	16	–	2	.889	27	–	8	.771
Longwood	12	–	6	.667	20	–	12	.625
Radford	12	–	6	.667	21	–	15	.583
USC Upstate	10	–	8	.556	16	–	16	.500
Gardner–Webb	10	–	8	.556	15	–	16	.484
Winthrop	10	–	8	.556	15	–	17	.469
Campbell	8	–	10	.444	16	–	18	.471
High Point	6	–	12	.333	14	–	17	.452
Charleston Southern	5	–	13	.278	10	–	21	.323
Presbyterian	1	–	17	.056	5	–	27	.156
† 2023 Big South tournament winner

The 2022–23 Radford Highlanders men's basketball team represented Radford University in the 2022–23 NCAA Division I men's basketball season. The Highlanders, led by second-year head coach Darris Nichols, played their home games at the Dedmon Center in Radford, Virginia, as members of the Big South Conference.

== Previous season ==
The Highlanders finished the 2021–22 season 11–18, 7–9 in Big South play to finish in a tie for third place in the North Division. In the Big South tournament, they were defeated by North Carolina A&T in the first round.

== Roster ==
2022–23 Radford Highlanders men's basketball team
Players
Coaches

Pos.	#	Name	Height	Weight	Year	Hometown
F	0	Justin Archer	6 ft 7 in (2.01 m)	205 lb (93 kg)	So	North Brunswick, New Jersey
G	1	DaQuan Smith	6 ft 1 in (1.85 m)	195 lb (88 kg)	RS Jr	Holly Springs, Mississippi
G	2	Josiah Jeffers	6 ft 1 in (1.85 m)	170 lb (77 kg)	Sr	Burlington, North Carolina
G	3	Kenyon Giles	5 ft 11 in (1.8 m)	165 lb (75 kg)	Fr	Chesapeake, Virginia
G	4	Derrick Jones Jr.	6 ft 6 in (1.98 m)	180 lb (82 kg)	So	Charlottesville, Virginia
F	5	Souleymane Koureissi	6 ft 10 in (2.08 m)	210 lb (95 kg)	GS	Harlem, New York
G	12	Onyebuchi Ezeakudo	6 ft 2 in (1.88 m)	200 lb (91 kg)	GS	Fort Wayne, Indiana
F	13	Shaquan Jules	6 ft 7 in (2.01 m)	235 lb (107 kg)	Sr	Orlando, Florida
G	14	Bryan Antoine	6 ft 5 in (1.96 m)	185 lb (84 kg)	Jr	Tinton Falls, New Jersey
F	15	Madiaw Niang	6 ft 10 in (2.08 m)	230 lb (104 kg)	GS	Dakar, Senegal
C	21	D'Auntray Pierce	6 ft 10 in (2.08 m)	200 lb (91 kg)	Jr	Denver, Colorado
G	25	Hunter Castleberry	6 ft 3 in (1.91 m)	175 lb (79 kg)	Fr	Charleston, West Virginia
G	30	Austin Johnson	6 ft 4 in (1.93 m)	150 lb (68 kg)	Fr	St. Augustine, Florida
F	34	David Vidor	6 ft 8 in (2.03 m)	185 lb (84 kg)	Fr	Budapest, Hungary
F	54	Ibu Yamazaki	6 ft 7 in (2.01 m)	215 lb (98 kg)	Fr	Matsudo, Japan

Head coach

- Darris Nichols (West Virginia)

Assistant coach(es)

- Shane Nichols (Wofford)
- Timothy Peete (Tulsa)
- James Haring (West Virginia)

Legend

- (C) Team captain
- (S) Suspended
- (I) Ineligible
- (W) Walk-on
- Injured
- Current redshirt

Roster
Last update: January 6, 2023

== Schedule and results ==
Date time, TV	Rank^{#}	Opponent^{#}	Result	Record	Site (attendance) city, state
Exhibition
November 1, 2022*; 7:00 pm		Mary Baldwin	W 114–54	–	Dedmon Center (300); Radford, VA
Non-conference regular season
November 7, 2022*; 7:30 pm, FS1		at Marquette	L 69–79	0–1	Fiserv Forum (12,393); Milwaukee, WI
November 10, 2022*; 7:00 pm, ACCN		at Notre Dame	L 76–79	0–2	Joyce Center (4,698); South Bend, IN
November 14, 2022*; 7:00 pm, ESPN+		Bridgewater	W 97–46	1–2	Dedmon Center (1,459); Radford, VA
November 16, 2022*; 7:00 pm, ESPN+		Averett	W 79–34	2–2	Dedmon Center (1,488); Radford, VA
November 20, 2022*; 2:00 pm		vs. Army; William & Mary MTE	W 90–75	3–2	Kaplan Arena (505); Williamsburg, VA
November 23, 2022*; 2:00 pm, FloHoops		at William & Mary; William & Mary MTE	L 51–62	3–3	Kaplan Arena (1,776); Williamsburg, VA
November 27, 2022*; 2:00 pm, FloHoops		at Elon	W 69–53	4–3	Schar Center (1,486); Elon, NC
December 1, 2022*; 7:00 pm, ESPN+		North Carolina Central	W 80–78	5–3	Dedmon Center (1,213); Radford, VA
December 4, 2022*; 2:00 pm, ESPN+		George Washington	W 86–76	6–3	Dedmon Center (1,246); Radford, VA
December 10, 2022*; 1:00 pm, ESPN+		at VMI	L 74–77	6–4	Cameron Hall (2,746); Lexington, VA
December 14, 2022*; 7:00 pm, ESPN+		at VCU	L 62–70	6–5	Siegel Center (7,314); Richmond, VA
December 17, 2022*; 7:00 pm, ESPN+		at Eastern Kentucky	L 65–67	6–6	Baptist Health Arena (2,991); Richmond, KY
December 21, 2022*; 2:30 pm, Big 12 Now		at Kansas State	L 65–73	6–7	Bramlage Coliseum (6,939); Manhattan, KS
Big South Conference regular season
December 29, 2022; 4:00 pm, ESPN+		at UNC Asheville	L 58–62	6–8 (0–1)	Kimmel Arena (1,147); Asheville, NC
December 31, 2022; 2:00 pm, ESPN+		Presbyterian	W 69–51	7–8 (1–1)	Dedmon Center (1,001); Radford, VA
January 4, 2023; 7:00 pm, ESPN+		USC Upstate	L 60–65	7–9 (1–2)	Dedmon Center (942); Radford, VA
January 7, 2023; 2:00 pm, ESPN+		at Gardner–Webb	W 63–59	8–9 (2–2)	Paul Porter Arena (352); Boiling Springs, NC
January 11, 2023; 7:00 pm, ESPN+		at Winthrop	W 66–52	9–9 (3–2)	Winthrop Coliseum (1,014); Rock Hill, SC
January 14, 2023; 2:00 pm, ESPN+		Charleston Southern	W 75–70	10–9 (4–2)	Dedmon Center (1,360); Radford, VA
January 18, 2023; 7:00 pm, ESPN+		at Campbell	W 63–55	11–9 (5–2)	Gore Arena (1,466); Buies Creek, NC
January 21, 2023; 2:00 pm, ESPN3+		High Point	W 95–80	12–9 (6–2)	Dedmon Center (1,671); Radford, VA
January 26, 2023; 7:00 pm, ESPN+		Longwood	W 63–59	13–9 (7–2)	Dedmon Center (2,357); Radford, VA
January 28, 2023; 2:00 pm, ESPN+		at USC Upstate	W 55–52	14–9 (8–2)	G. B. Hodge Center; Spartanburg, SC
February 1, 2023; 7:00 pm, ESPN+		at Presbyterian	W 67–59	15–9 (9–2)	Templeton Physical Education Center (338); Clinton, SC
February 4, 2023; 2:00 pm, ESPN+		Winthrop	W 69–66	16–9 (10–2)	Dedmon Center (1,421); Radford, VA
February 9, 2023; 7:00 pm, ESPN+		Gardner–Webb	L 48–61	16–10 (10–3)	Dedmon Center (2,087); Radford, VA
February 11, 2023; 5:30 pm, ESPN+		at Charleston Southern	W 90–71	17–10 (11–3)	Buccaneer Field House (829); North Charleston, SC
February 16, 2023; 7:00 pm, ESPNU		UNC Asheville	L 54–63	17–11 (11–4)	Dedmon Center (1,819); Radford, VA
February 18, 2023; 3:00 pm, ESPN+		at Longwood	L 63–73	17–12 (11–5)	Willett Hall (1,900); Farmville, VA
February 22, 2023; 7:00 pm, ESPN+		at High Point	L 64–69	17–13 (11–6)	Qubein Center (3,476); High Point, NC
February 25, 2023; 2:00 pm, ESPN+		Campbell	W 67–65	18–13 (12–6)	Dedmon Center (1,484); Radford, VA
Big South tournament
March 3, 2023; 8:00 pm, ESPN+	(3)	vs. (6) Winthrop; Quarterfinals	W 78–69	19–13	Bojangles Coliseum (3,410); Charlotte, NC
March 4, 2023; 2:00 pm, ESPN+	(3)	vs. (7) Campbell; Semifinals	L 71–72	19–14	Bojangles Coliseum; Charlotte, NC
College Basketball Invitational
March 19, 2023; 5:00 p.m., FloHoops	(10)	vs. (7) Tarleton State; First round	W 72–70 ^{OT}	20–14	Ocean Center; Daytona Beach, FL
March 20, 2023; 4:30 p.m., FloHoops	(10)	vs. (2) San Jose State; Quarterfinals	W 67–57	21–14	Ocean Center; Daytona Beach, FL
March 21, 2023; 9:30 p.m., ESPN2	(10)	vs. (3) Charlotte; Semifinals	L 56–63	21–15	Ocean Center; Daytona Beach, FL
*Non-conference game. ^{#}Rankings from AP Poll. (#) Tournament seedings in parentheses. All times are in Eastern.
