= 2022–23 Winthrop Eagles men's basketball team =

American college basketball season

2022–23 Winthrop Eagles men's basketball
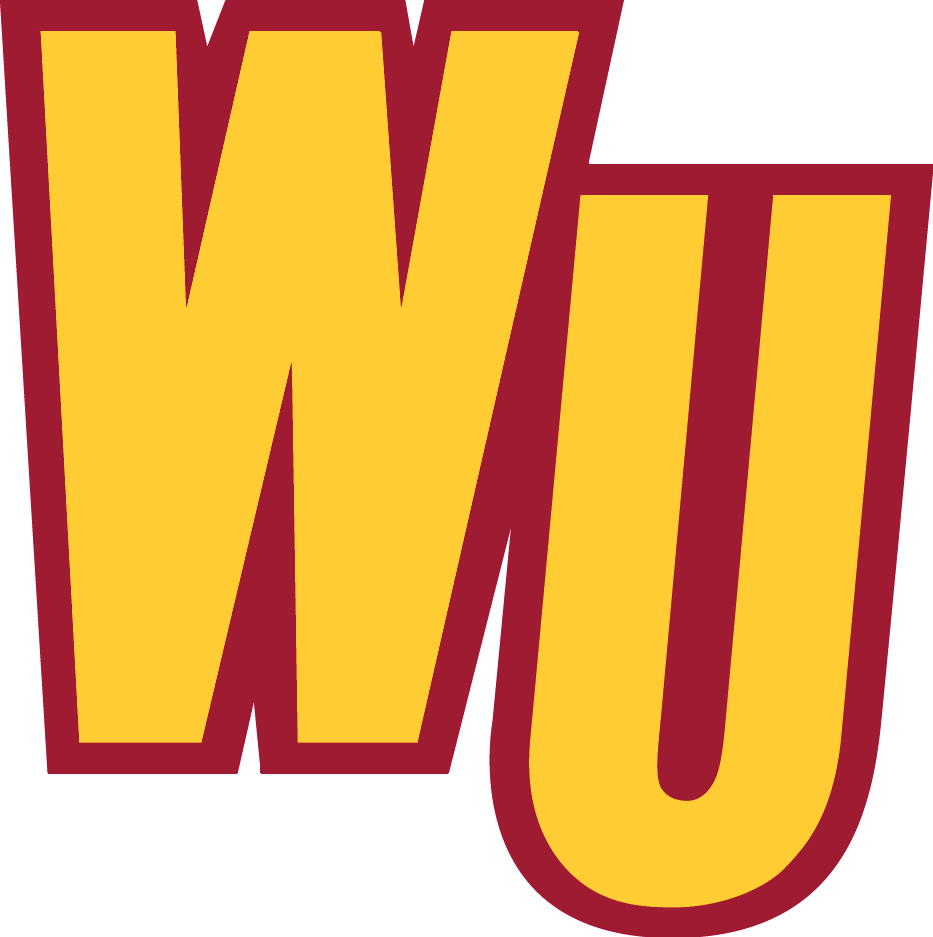
- Conference: Big South Conference
- Record: 15–17 (10–8 Big South)
- Head coach: Mark Prosser (2nd season)
- Assistant coaches: Tony Rack; Ben Betts; Mitchell Hill
- Home arena: Winthrop Coliseum

2022–23 Big South men's basketball standings
	Conf.				Overall
Team	W		L	PCT	W		L	PCT
UNC Asheville †	16	–	2	.889	27	–	8	.771
Longwood	12	–	6	.667	20	–	12	.625
Radford	12	–	6	.667	21	–	15	.583
USC Upstate	10	–	8	.556	16	–	16	.500
Gardner–Webb	10	–	8	.556	15	–	16	.484
Winthrop	10	–	8	.556	15	–	17	.469
Campbell	8	–	10	.444	16	–	18	.471
High Point	6	–	12	.333	14	–	17	.452
Charleston Southern	5	–	13	.278	10	–	21	.323
Presbyterian	1	–	17	.056	5	–	27	.156
† 2023 Big South tournament winner

The 2022–23 Winthrop Eagles men's basketball team represented Winthrop University in the 2022–23 NCAA Division I men's basketball season. The Eagles, led by second-year head coach Mark Prosser, played their home games at the Winthrop Coliseum in Rock Hill, South Carolina as members of the Big South Conference.

== Previous season ==
The Eagles finished the 2021–22 season 23–9, 14–2 in Big South play to finish as Big South South Division champions. As the No. 2 seed in the Big South tournament, they defeated High Point and Gardner–Webb, before falling to Longwood in the championship game.

== Roster ==
2022–23 Winthrop Eagles men's basketball team
Players
Coaches

Pos.	#	Name	Height	Weight	Year	Hometown
G	0	Sin'Cere McMahon	6 ft 1 in (1.85 m)	167 lb (76 kg)	Jr	Indianapolis, Indiana
G	1	Toneari Lane	6 ft 5 in (1.96 m)	210 lb (95 kg)	RS So	Atlanta, Georgia
G	2	Xavier McKelvy	6 ft 2 in (1.88 m)	180 lb (82 kg)	Fr	Charlotte, North Carolina
G	3	Micheal Anumba	6 ft 4 in (1.93 m)	220 lb (100 kg)	GS	Reggio Emilia, Italy
F	4	Kelton Talford	6 ft 7 in (2.01 m)	195 lb (88 kg)	Jr	Great Falls, South Carolina
G	5	Howard Fleming Jr.	6 ft 5 in (1.96 m)	200 lb (91 kg)	Jr	Louisville, Kentucky
G	10	Cameron Whiteside	6 ft 5 in (1.96 m)	195 lb (88 kg)	RS Jr	Thomasville, North Carolina
G	11	Kasen Harrison	6 ft 2 in (1.88 m)	190 lb (86 kg)	Jr	Beaumont, Texas
F	12	Cory Hightower	6 ft 7 in (2.01 m)	222 lb (101 kg)	RS Sr	Flint, Michigan
G	13	Clay Howard	6 ft 3 in (1.91 m)	180 lb (82 kg)	Fr	Aiken, South Carolina
F	15	Lawrence Bartee	6 ft 11 in (2.11 m)	220 lb (100 kg)	Fr	Clover, South Carolina
G	21	Isaiah Wilson	6 ft 1 in (1.85 m)	170 lb (77 kg)	Jr	Pittsburgh, Pennsylvania
F	23	Michael Moore	6 ft 10 in (2.08 m)	220 lb (100 kg)	Fr	Hermitage, Pennsylvania
F	25	Yoro Diallo	6 ft 8 in (2.03 m)	200 lb (91 kg)	Fr	Cincinnati, Ohio
F	33	Chase Claxton	6 ft 7 in (2.01 m)	185 lb (84 kg)	Sr	Greenville, South Carolina

Head coach

- Mark Prosser (Marist)

Assistant coach(es)

- Tony Rack (Northern Kentucky)
- Ben Betts (Roanoke)
- Mitchell Hill (Tennessee Tech)

Legend

- (C) Team captain
- (S) Suspended
- (I) Ineligible
- (W) Walk-on
- Injured
- Current redshirt

Roster
Last update: January 3, 2023

== Schedule and results ==
Date time, TV	Rank^{#}	Opponent^{#}	Result	Record	Site (attendance) city, state
Non-conference regular season
November 7, 2022*; 7:00 pm, BTN+		at Penn State	L 68–93	0–1	Bryce Jordan Center (6,572); University Park, PA
November 9, 2022*; 7:00 pm, ESPN+		Piedmont	W 78–56	1–1	Winthrop Coliseum (875); Rock Hill, SC
November 12, 2022*; 4:00 pm, ESPN+		Middle Tennessee	W 76–68	2–1	Winthrop Coliseum (1,642); Rock Hill, SC
November 15, 2022*; 7:00 pm, SECN		at No. 13 Auburn; Cancún Challenge campus-site game	L 65–89	2–2	Neville Arena (9,121); Auburn, AL
November 19, 2022*; 2:00 pm, ESPN+		at Mercer	L 68–77	2–3	Hawkins Arena (964); Macon, GA
November 22, 2022*; 3:00 pm, FloHoops		vs. Southern Miss; Cancún Challenge Mayan Semifinals	L 52–77	2–4	Hard Rock Hotel Riviera Maya (107); Cancún, Mexico
November 23, 2022*; 12:30 pm, FloHoops		vs. Eastern Michigan; Cancún Challenge Mayan Consolation	W 101–87	3–4	Hard Rock Hotel Riviera Maya (107); Cancún, Mexico
November 29, 2022*; 7:00 pm, ESPN+		Toccoa Falls	W 99–52	4–4	Winthrop Coliseum (544); Rock Hill, SC
December 3, 2022*; 2:00 pm, ESPN+		Coastal Carolina	L 81–86	4–5	Winthrop Coliseum (1,218); Rock Hill, SC
December 6, 2022*; 7:00 pm, ESPN+		South Carolina State	W 81–67	5–5	Winthrop Coliseum (818); Rock Hill, SC
December 10, 2022*; 4:00 pm, ESPN+		at Furman	L 67–82	5–6	Timmons Arena (2,017); Greenville, SC
December 17, 2022*; 7:00 pm, SECN		at LSU	L 81–89	5–7	Pete Maravich Assembly Center (9,067); Baton Rouge, LA
December 21, 2022*; 2:00 pm, ESPN+		at Duquesne	L 57–74	5–8	UPMC Cooper Fieldhouse (1,721); Pittsburgh, PA
Big South regular season
December 29, 2022; 5:00 pm, ESPN+		at USC Upstate	L 62–70	5–9 (0–1)	G. B. Hodge Center (357); Spartanburg, SC
December 31, 2022; 2:00 pm, ESPN+		UNC Asheville	W 62–60	6–9 (1–1)	Winthrop Coliseum (1,134); Rock Hill, SC
January 4, 2023; 7:00 pm, ESPN+		Presbyterian	W 82–72	7–9 (2–1)	Winthrop Coliseum (1,066); Rock Hill, SC
January 7, 2023; 4:00 pm, ESPN+		at Longwood	L 71–85	7–10 (2–2)	Willett Hall (1,323); Farmville, VA
January 11, 2023; 7:00 pm, ESPN+		Radford	L 52–66	7–11 (2–3)	Winthrop Coliseum (1,014); Rock Hill, SC
January 14, 2023; 2:00 pm, ESPN+		at Campbell	W 78–74	8–11 (3–3)	Gore Arena (1,638); Buies Creek, NC
January 18, 2023; 7:00 pm, ESPN+		at High Point	L 66–71	8–12 (3–4)	Qubein Center (2,912); High Point, NC
January 21, 2023; 2:00 pm, ESPN+		Gardner–Webb	L 61–63	8–13 (3–5)	Winthrop Coliseum (1,290); Rock Hill, SC
January 25, 2023; 7:00 pm, ESPN+		Charleston Southern	W 76–64	9–13 (4–5)	Winthrop Coliseum (1,118); Rock Hill, SC
January 28, 2023; 2:00 pm, ESPN+		at Presbyterian	W 76–58	10–13 (5–5)	Templeton Physical Education Center (431); Clinton, SC
February 1, 2023; 7:00 pm, ESPN+		Longwood	W 76–74	11–13 (6–5)	Winthrop Coliseum (968); Rock Hill, SC
February 4, 2023; 2:00 pm, ESPN+		at Radford	L 66–69	11–14 (6–6)	Dedmon Center (1,421); Radford, VA
February 8, 2023; 6:30 pm, ESPN+		at UNC Asheville	L 79–86	11–15 (6–7)	Kimmel Arena (2,016); Asheville, NC
February 11, 2023; 5:00 pm, ESPN+		USC Upstate	L 70–79	11–16 (6–8)	Winthrop Coliseum (1,400); Rock Hill, SC
February 15, 2023; 7:00 pm, ESPN+		at Gardner–Webb	W 86–78	12–16 (7–8)	Paul Porter Arena (552); Boiling Springs, NC
February 18, 2023; 5:30 pm, ESPN+		at Charleston Southern	W 75–67	13–16 (8–8)	Buccaneer Field House (802); North Charleston, SC
February 22, 2023; 7:00 pm, ESPN+		Campbell	W 95–93 ^{OT}	14–16 (9–8)	Winthrop Coliseum (1,101); Rock Hill, SC
February 25, 2023; 2:00 pm, ESPN+		High Point	W 84–78	15–16 (10–8)	Winthrop Coliseum (1,504); Rock Hill, SC
Big South tournament
March 3, 2023; 8:00 pm, ESPN+	(6)	vs. (3) Radford; Quarterfinals	L 69–78	15–17	Bojangles Coliseum (3,410); Charlotte, NC
*Non-conference game. ^{#}Rankings from AP Poll. (#) Tournament seedings in parentheses. All times are in Eastern.
