= 2022–23 Gardner–Webb Runnin' Bulldogs men's basketball team =

American college basketball season

2022–23 Gardner–Webb Runnin' Bulldogs men's basketball
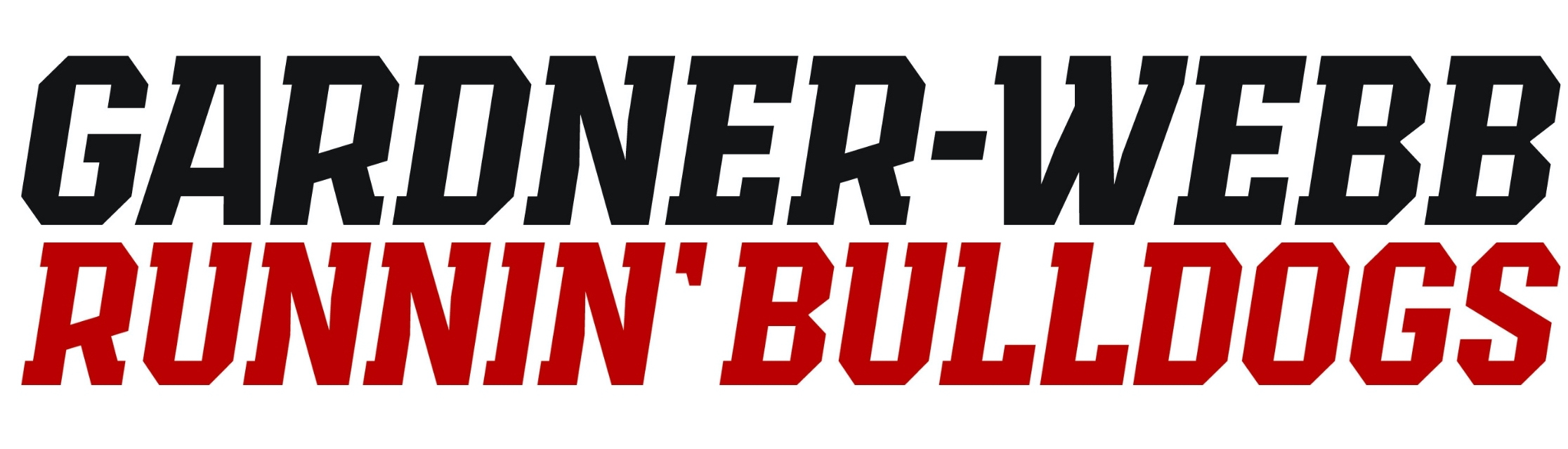
- Conference: Big South Conference
- Record: 15–16 (10–8 Big South)
- Head coach: Tim Craft (10th season)
- Associate head coach: Jeremy Luther
- Assistant coaches: Jake DeLaney; Andrew Brown
- Home arena: Paul Porter Arena

2022–23 Big South men's basketball standings
	Conf.				Overall
Team	W		L	PCT	W		L	PCT
UNC Asheville †	16	–	2	.889	27	–	8	.771
Longwood	12	–	6	.667	20	–	12	.625
Radford	12	–	6	.667	21	–	15	.583
USC Upstate	10	–	8	.556	16	–	16	.500
Gardner–Webb	10	–	8	.556	15	–	16	.484
Winthrop	10	–	8	.556	15	–	17	.469
Campbell	8	–	10	.444	16	–	18	.471
High Point	6	–	12	.333	14	–	17	.452
Charleston Southern	5	–	13	.278	10	–	21	.323
Presbyterian	1	–	17	.056	5	–	27	.156
† 2023 Big South tournament winner

The 2022–23 Gardner–Webb Runnin' Bulldogs men's basketball team represented Gardner–Webb University in the 2022–23 NCAA Division I men's basketball season. The Runnin' Bulldogs, led by tenth-year head coach Tim Craft, played their home games at Paul Porter Arena in Boiling Springs, North Carolina as members of the Big South Conference.

== Previous season ==
The Runnin' Bulldogs finished the 2021–22 season 18–13, 11–5 in Big South play to finish in second place in the South Division. As the No. 3 seed, they defeated Campbell in the quarterfinals of the Big South tournament, before falling to Winthrop in the semifinals.

== Roster ==
2022–23 Gardner–Webb Runnin' Bulldogs men's basketball team
Players
Coaches

Pos.	#	Name	Height	Weight	Year	Hometown
G	0	Caleb Robinson	6 ft 5 in (1.96 m)	200 lb (91 kg)	So	Lake Arthur, Louisiana
G	1	Julien Soumaoro	5 ft 11 in (1.8 m)	165 lb (75 kg)	So	Bronx, New York
G	2	Brendan Mykalcio	6 ft 7 in (2.01 m)	190 lb (86 kg)	So	New City, New York
G	3	Quest Aldridge	6 ft 4 in (1.93 m)	185 lb (84 kg)	Sr	Winston-Salem, North Carolina
G	4	DQ Nicholas	6 ft 1 in (1.85 m)	180 lb (82 kg)	Jr	Atlanta, Georgia
F	5	Ademide Badmus	6 ft 7 in (2.01 m)	245 lb (111 kg)	So	Lynn, Massachusetts
G	10	Chance Thacker	6 ft 4 in (1.93 m)	190 lb (86 kg)	Fr	Suwanee, Georgia
G	11	Leon Williams	6 ft 3 in (1.91 m)	185 lb (84 kg)	So	Cambridge, Massachusetts
G	13	Lucas Stieber	6 ft 3 in (1.91 m)	185 lb (84 kg)	Jr	Green Bay, Wisconsin
F	14	Kareem Reid	6 ft 9 in (2.06 m)	205 lb (93 kg)	Sr	Queens, New York
F	15	Cheickna Sissoko	6 ft 9 in (2.06 m)	230 lb (104 kg)	Jr	Bamako, Mali
G	23	Anthony Selden	6 ft 6 in (1.98 m)	220 lb (100 kg)	Jr	Boston, Massachusetts
F	24	Ludovic Dufeal	6 ft 8 in (2.03 m)	200 lb (91 kg)	Sr	Saint-Joseph, Martinique
C	25	Sammy Itodo	6 ft 8 in (2.03 m)	210 lb (95 kg)	Jr	Kaduna, Nigeria
F	31	John Roghelia	6 ft 2 in (1.88 m)	185 lb (84 kg)	Sr	Wilmington, North Carolina
G	35	Isaiah Hicks	6 ft 0 in (1.83 m)	185 lb (84 kg)	Fr	Shelby, North Carolina

Head coach

- Tim Craft (Florida)

Assistant coach(es)

- Jeremy Luther (North Greenville)
- Jake DeLaney (Gardner–Webb)
- Andrew Brown (Mercer)

Legend

- (C) Team captain
- (S) Suspended
- (I) Ineligible
- (W) Walk-on
- Injured
- Current redshirt

Roster
Last update: January 3, 2023

== Schedule and results ==
Date time, TV	Rank^{#}	Opponent^{#}	Result	Record	Site (attendance) city, state
Exhibition
November 3, 2022*; 7:00 pm		Erskine	W 110–62	–	Paul Porter Arena (500); Boiling Springs, NC
Non-conference regular season
November 7, 2022*; 9:00 pm, MW Network		at Colorado State	L 63–65	0–1	Moby Arena; Fort Collins, CO
November 10, 2022*; 7:30 pm, ESPN+		at Stephen F. Austin	L 71–86	0–2	William R. Johnson Coliseum (2,049); Nacogdoches, TX
November 15, 2022*; 8:00 pm, ACCN		at No. 1 North Carolina	L 66–72	0–3	Dean Smith Center (17,200); Chapel Hill, NC
November 18, 2022*; 7:00 pm, ESPN+		at Wofford; Battle of the Carolinas	L 58–60	0–4	Jerry Richardson Indoor Stadium (1,107); Spartanburg, SC
November 19, 2022*; 5:00 pm		vs. North Carolina A&T; Battle of the Carolinas	W 66–64	1–4	Jerry Richardson Indoor Stadium (268); Spartanburg, SC
November 26, 2022*; 3:30 pm, HBCU GO		North Carolina Central	L 53–58	1–5	Paul Porter Arena (1,242); Boiling Springs, NC
November 30, 2022*; 7:00 pm, ESPN+		at Western Carolina	W 71–55	2–5	Ramsey Center (2,125); Cullowhee, NC
December 3, 2022*; 12:00 pm, ESPN+		Chattanooga	L 71–82	2–6	Paul Porter Arena (334); Boiling Springs, NC
December 10, 2022*; 8:00 pm, ESPN+		at Old Dominion	L 43–44	2–7	Chartway Arena (4,741); Norfolk, VA
December 14, 2022*; 7:00 pm, ESPN+		Carolina	W 120–44	3–7	Paul Porter Arena (106); Boiling Springs, NC
December 17, 2022*; 2:00 pm, ESPN+		North Carolina Central	W 72–70	4–7	Paul Porter Arena (247); Boiling Springs, NC
December 19, 2022*; 11:00 am, ESPN+		Bob Jones	W 116–55	5–7	Paul Porter Arena (1,419); Boiling Springs, NC
Big South regular season
December 29, 2022; 5:00 pm, ESPN+		Charleston Southern	W 83–63	6–7 (1–0)	Paul Porter Arena (494); Boiling Springs, NC
December 31, 2022; 2:00 pm, ESPN+		at High Point	W 80–73	7–7 (2–0)	Qubein Center (2,717); High Point, NC
January 4, 2023; 7:00 pm, ESPN+		at Campbell	L 58–63	7–8 (2–1)	Gore Arena (921); Buies Creek, NC
January 7, 2023; 2:00 pm, ESPN+		Radford	L 59–63	7–9 (2–2)	Paul Porter Arena (352); Boiling Springs, NC
January 11, 2023; 7:00 pm, ESPN+		at Presbyterian	W 79–78 ^{OT}	8–9 (3–2)	Templeton Physical Education Center (416); Clinton, SC
January 14, 2023; 2:00 pm, ESPN+		UNC Asheville	L 67–72 ^{OT}	8–10 (3–3)	Paul Porter Arena (777); Boiling Springs, NC
January 18, 2023; 7:00 pm, ESPN+		at Longwood	L 59–64	8–11 (3–4)	Willett Hall (1,548); Farmville, VA
January 21, 2023; 2:00 pm, ESPN+		at Winthrop	W 63–61	9–11 (4–4)	Winthrop Coliseum (1,290); Rock Hill, SC
January 25, 2023; 7:00 pm, ESPN+		USC Upstate	W 78–66	10–11 (5–4)	Paul Porter Arena (702); Boiling Springs, NC
January 28, 2023; 2:00 pm, ESPN+		High Point	W 86–58	11–11 (6–4)	Paul Porter Arena (503); Boiling Springs, NC
February 1, 2023; 7:00 pm, ESPN+		at Charleston Southern	W 67–59	12–11 (7–4)	Buccaneer Field House (791); North Charleston, SC
February 4, 2023; 2:00 pm, ESPN+		Presbyterian	W 56–48	13–11 (8–4)	Paul Porter Arena (836); Boiling Springs, NC
February 9, 2023; 7:00 pm, ESPN+		at Radford	W 61–48	14–11 (9–4)	Dedmon Center (2,087); Radford, VA
February 11, 2023; 2:00 pm, ESPN3		Campbell	W 77–73	15–11 (10–4)	Paul Porter Arena (1,174); Boiling Springs, NC
February 15, 2023; 7:00 pm, ESPN+		Winthrop	L 78–86	15–12 (10–5)	Paul Porter Arena (552); Boiling Springs, NC
February 18, 2023; 3:00 pm, Nexstar/ESPN+		at UNC Asheville	L 63–75	15–13 (10–6)	Kimmel Arena (2,957); Asheville, NC
February 23, 2023; 7:00 pm, ESPN+		Longwood	L 63–75	15–14 (10–7)	Paul Porter Arena (1,084); Boiling Springs, NC
February 25, 2023; 3:00 pm, ESPN+		at USC Upstate	L 69–75	15–15 (10–8)	G. B. Hodge Center (833); Spartanburg, SC
Big South tournament
March 3, 2023; 2:00 pm, ESPN+	(5)	vs. (4) USC Upstate; Quarterfinals	L 76–77	15–16	Bojangles Coliseum; Charlotte, NC
*Non-conference game. ^{#}Rankings from AP Poll. (#) Tournament seedings in parentheses. All times are in Eastern.

== See also ==
- 2022–23 Gardner–Webb Runnin' Bulldogs women's basketball team
