= 2022–23 High Point Panthers men's basketball team =

American college basketball season

2022–23 High Point Panthers men's basketball

SoCal Challenge Sand Division Champions
- Conference: Big South Conference
- Record: 14–17 (6–12 Big South)
- Head coach: G. G. Smith (1st season)
- Assistant coaches: Linc Darner; Eric Grabriel; Keith Gatlin
- Home arena: Qubein Center

2022–23 Big South men's basketball standings
	Conf.				Overall
Team	W		L	PCT	W		L	PCT
UNC Asheville †	16	–	2	.889	27	–	8	.771
Longwood	12	–	6	.667	20	–	12	.625
Radford	12	–	6	.667	21	–	15	.583
USC Upstate	10	–	8	.556	16	–	16	.500
Gardner–Webb	10	–	8	.556	15	–	16	.484
Winthrop	10	–	8	.556	15	–	17	.469
Campbell	8	–	10	.444	16	–	18	.471
High Point	6	–	12	.333	14	–	17	.452
Charleston Southern	5	–	13	.278	10	–	21	.323
Presbyterian	1	–	17	.056	5	–	27	.156
† 2023 Big South tournament winner

The 2022–23 High Point Panthers men's basketball team represented High Point University in the 2022–23 NCAA Division I men's basketball season. The Panthers were led by second-year head coach G. G. Smith, his first full year as head coach. The Panthers played their home games at the Qubein Center in High Point, North Carolina as members of the Big South Conference. They finished the season 14–17, 6–12 in Big South play to finish eighth place. They lost to Charleston Southern in the first round of the Big South tournament.

On March 3, the school fired head coach GG Smith. On March 27, the school named Creighton assistant coach Alan Huss the team's new head coach.

== Previous season ==
The Panthers finished the 2021–22 season 14–17, 7–9 in Big South play to finish in tied for third place in the North Division. In the Big South tournament, they defeated Hampton in the first round, before falling to Winthrop in the quarterfinals.

== Offseason ==
=== Departures ===
Departures
Name	Number	Pos.	Height	Weight	Year	Hometown	Notes
John-Michael Wright	1	G	6'0"	186	Junior	Fayetteville, North Carolina	Transferred to Oklahoma State
Rob Peterson III	22	F	6'4"	190	Senior	Charlotte, North Carolina	Graduated
Caleb Wright	24	F	6'3"	206	Redshirt Freshman	Phoenix, Arizona	Transferred to Lincoln (MO)
John-Michael Hughes	32	G	6'0"	181	Redshirt Junior	Ligonier, Pennsylvania	Transferred to The Citadel
Caden Sanchez	35	F	6'6"	236	Redshirt Senior	Columbus, Ohio	Graduated

=== Incoming transfers ===
Incoming transfers
Name	Number	Pos.	Height	Weight	Year	Hometown	Previous School
Ahmard Harvey	1	G	6'7"	--	Redshirt Junior	Freeport, Bahamas	Coastal Carolina
Abdoulaye Thiam	11	G	6'4"	225	Redshirt Sophomore	Orlando, Florida	Minnesota

=== Recruiting class ===
College recruiting information
Name	Hometown	School	Height	Weight	Commit date
Sam Perez; F	Raleigh, North Carolina	Trinity Academy (NC)	6 ft 8 in (2.03 m)	210 lb (95 kg)	Aug 3, 2021
Sam Perez; F	Recruit ratings: Scout: Rivals: 247Sports: (NR)				
Liam Carney; G	Minneapolis, Minnesota	Providence Academy (MN)	6 ft 6 in (1.98 m)	195 lb (88 kg)	May 9, 2022
Liam Carney; G	Recruit ratings: Scout: Rivals: 247Sports: (NR)				
Justin Taylor; G	Charlotte, North Carolina	Hargrave Military Academy	6 ft 2 in (1.88 m)	175 lb (79 kg)	May 26, 2022
Justin Taylor; G	Recruit ratings: Scout: Rivals: 247Sports: (NR)				
Overall recruit ranking:
Note: In many cases, Scout, Rivals, 247Sports, On3, and ESPN may conflict in their listings of height and weight.; In these cases, the average was taken. ESPN grades are on a 100-point scale.; Sources: "2022 Team Ranking". Rivals.

== Roster ==
2022–23 High Point Panthers men's basketball team
Players
Coaches

Pos.	#	Name	Height	Weight	Year	Hometown
F	1	Ahmard Harvey	6 ft 7 in (2.01 m)	195 lb (88 kg)	RS Jr	Freeport, Bahamas
G	2	Jaden House	6 ft 4 in (1.93 m)	201 lb (91 kg)	Jr	Richmond, VA
G	3	Ahmil Flowers	6 ft 4 in (1.93 m)	180 lb (82 kg)	Jr	Greensboro, NC
F	4	Alex Holt	6 ft 8 in (2.03 m)	245 lb (111 kg)	Jr	Lexington, NC
G	5	Bryant Randleman	6 ft 4 in (1.93 m)	190 lb (86 kg)	Sr	Durham, NC
F/C	10	Emmanuel Izunabor	6 ft 8 in (2.03 m)	217 lb (98 kg)	Sr	Fayetteville, NC
F	11	Abdoulaye Thiam	6 ft 4 in (1.93 m)	180 lb (82 kg)	RS So	Orlando, FL
G	12	Bryson Childress	5 ft 8 in (1.73 m)	150 lb (68 kg)	Jr	Albemarle, NC
F	13	Liam Carney	6 ft 6 in (1.98 m)	195 lb (88 kg)	Fr	Minneapolis, MN
G	15	Justin Taylor	6 ft 2 in (1.88 m)	175 lb (79 kg)	Fr	Charlotte, NC
G	23	Brock Williams	6 ft 0 in (1.83 m)	171 lb (78 kg)	So	Burlington, NC
F	24	Sam Perez	6 ft 8 in (2.03 m)	210 lb (95 kg)	Fr	Raleigh, NC
G	30	Camren Little	6 ft 3 in (1.91 m)	200 lb (91 kg)	So	Charlotte, NC
G	31	AJ Hoynack	6 ft 3 in (1.91 m)	190 lb (86 kg)	Jr	Miami, FL
F	42	Jake Koverman	6 ft 5 in (1.96 m)	192 lb (87 kg)	So	Severna Park, MD
F	55	Zack Austin	6 ft 7 in (2.01 m)	201 lb (91 kg)	RS So	Winston-Salem, NC

Head coach

- G. G. Smith (Georgia)

Assistant coach(es)

- Linc Darner (Purdue)
- Eric Gabriel (West Liberty)
- Keith Gatlin (Maryland)

Legend

- (C) Team captain
- (S) Suspended
- (I) Ineligible
- (W) Walk-on
- Injured
- Current redshirt

Roster
Last update: November 15, 2022

== Schedule and results ==
Date time, TV	Rank^{#}	Opponent^{#}	Result	Record	High points	High rebounds	High assists	Site (attendance) city, state
Exhibition
November 5, 2022*; 7:00 p.m.		Bridgewater	W 100–61		23 – Thiam	11 – Harvey	8 – Randleman	Qubein Center (2,908); High Point, NC
Regular season
November 7, 2022*; 8:00 p.m., ESPN+		Pfeiffer	W 111–71	1–0	23 – House	8 – Izunabor	5 – Randleman	Qubein Center (3,013); High Point, NC
November 12, 2022*; 4:00 p.m., ESPN+		Wofford	W 91–80	2–0	33 – House	10 – Tied	5 – Randleman	Qubein Center (3,765); High Point, NC
November 15, 2022*; 7:00 p.m., ESPN+		Lees–McRae	W 100–83	3–0	23 – Thiam	10 – Harvey	3 – Tied	Qubein Center (2,042); High Point, NC
November 18, 2022*; 10:00 p.m., MWN		at UNLV; SoCal Challenge campus-site game	L 68–78	3–1	20 – Tied	8 – Austin	8 – Randleman	Thomas & Mack Center (4,589); Paradise, NV
November 21, 2022*; 5:30 p.m., FloSports		vs. Central Michigan; SoCal Challenge Sand Division semifinals	W 68–67	4–1	26 – House	12 – Izunabor	2 – Randleman	The Pavilion at JSerra (350); San Juan Capistrano, CA
November 23, 2022*; 5:00 p.m., FloSports		vs. Tennessee State; SoCal Challenge Sand Division Final	W 77–72	5–1	18 – Randleman	9 – Thiam	3 – Randleman	The Pavilion at JSerra (300); San Juan Capistrano, CA
November 30, 2022*; 7:00 p.m., ESPN+		Elon	W 84–70	6–1	15 – Izunabor	9 – Izunabor	4 – Tied	Qubein Center (4,872); High Point, NC
December 3, 2022*; 2:00 p.m., ESPN+		North Florida	W 93–88	7–1	25 – Austin	10 – Izunabor	3 – House	Qubein Center (2,744); High Point, NC
December 6, 2022*; 7:00 p.m., ESPN+		at Furman	W 85–82	8–1	29 – House	7 – Tied	3 – Thiam	Timmons Arena (1,427); Greenville, SC
December 9, 2022*; 7:00 p.m., ESPN+		Queens	L 79–87	8–2	16 – Thiam	9 – Austin	6 – Randleman	Qubein Center (3,202); High Point, NC
December 18, 2022*; 2:00 p.m., FloSports		at UNC Wilmington	L 82–85	8–3	25 – House	9 – Harvey	3 – Randleman	Trask Coliseum (3,745); Wilmington, NC
December 21, 2022*; 6:00 p.m., ESPN+		at East Carolina	L 49–60	8–4	17 – House	9 – Harvey	1 – Tied	Williams Arena (3,618); Greenville, NC
Big South regular season
December 29, 2022; 3:00 p.m., ESPN+		at Longwood	L 73–87	8–5 (0–1)	18 – Austin	6 – Tied	4 – House	Willett Hall (496); Farmville, VA
December 31, 2022; 2:00 p.m., ESPN+		Gardner–Webb	L 73–80	8–6 (0–2)	23 – Thiam	11 – Tied	5 – Randleman	Qubein Center (2,717); High Point, NC
January 4, 2023; 7:00 p.m., ESPN+		UNC Asheville	L 72–76	8–7 (0–3)	17 – House	12 – Harvey	4 – Randleman	Qubein Center (2,021); High Point, NC
January 7, 2023; 3:00 p.m., ESPN+		at USC Upstate	L 57–76	8–8 (0–4)	15 – House	8 – Harvey	2 – Tied	G. B. Hodge Center (323); Spartanburg, SC
January 11, 2023; 7:00 p.m., ESPN+		at Charleston Southern	L 69–106	8–9 (0–5)	23 – House	6 – Harvey	3 – Randleman	Buccaneer Field House (792); North Charleston, SC
January 14, 2023; 7:00 p.m., ESPN+		Presbyterian	W 64–56	9–9 (1–5)	18 – House	10 – Harvey	4 – Childress	Qubein Center (4,206); High Point, NC
January 18, 2023; 7:00 p.m., ESPN+		Winthrop	W 71–66	10–9 (2–5)	19 – Austin	9 – Izunabor	6 – Randleman	Qubein Center (2,912); High Point, NC
January 21, 2023; 2:00 p.m., ESPN+		at Radford	L 80–95	10–10 (2–6)	26 – Austin	8 – Izunabor	6 – Thiam	Dedmon Center (1,671); Radford, VA
January 25, 2023; 7:00 p.m., ESPN+		Campbell	L 64–72	10–11 (2–7)	18 – Austin	9 – Austin	5 – Childress	Qubein Center (2,577); High Point, NC
January 28, 2023; 2:00 p.m., ESPN+		at Gardner-Webb	L 58–86	10–12 (2–8)	20 – House	7 – Holt	4 – House	Paul Porter Arena (503); Boiling Springs, NC
February 2, 2023; 6:00 p.m., ESPNU/ESPN+		at UNC Asheville	L 63–89	10–13 (2–9)	17 – Thiam	10 – Harvey	4 – Thiam	Kimmel Arena (2,288); Asheville, NC
February 4, 2023; 7:00 p.m., ESPN+		Charleston Southern	W 81–73	11–13 (3–9)	19 – Austin	11 – Harvey	6 – Austin	Qubein Center (6,030); High Point, NC
February 8, 2023; 7:00 p.m., ESPN+		at Campbell	L 66–82	11–14 (3–10)	20 – Childress	7 – Harvey	3 – House	Gore Arena (1,416); Buies Creek, NC
February 11, 2023; 4:00 p.m., ESPN+		Longwood	L 67–70	11–15 (3–11)	17 – Thiam	7 – Tied	4 – Tied	Qubein Center (3,418); High Point, NC
February 15, 2023; 7:00 p.m., ESPN+		at Presbyterian	W 71–69	12–15 (4–11)	21 – House	8 – Harvey	4 – Randleman	Templeton Physical Education Center (305); Clinton, SC
February 18, 2023; 4:00 p.m., ESPN+		USC-Upstate	W 81–66	13–15 (5–11)	24 – Thiam	7 – Tied	5 – Randleman	Qubein Center (3,019); High Point, NC
February 22, 2023; 7:00 p.m., ESPN+		Radford	W 69–64	14–15 (6–11)	20 – Austin	9 – Izunabor	4 – House	Qubein Center (3,476); High Point, NC
February 25, 2023; 2:00 p.m., ESPN+		at Winthrop	L 78–84	14–16 (6–12)	17 – Austin	10 – Austin	5 – Randleman	Winthrop Coliseum (1,504); Rock Hill, SC
Big South tournament
March 1, 2022; 6:00 pm, ESPN+	(8)	vs. (9) Charleston Southern; First round	L 70–72	14–17	24 – House	12 – Austin	6 – Randleman	Bojangles Coliseum (1,177); Charlotte, NC
*Non-conference game. ^{#}Rankings from AP Poll. (#) Tournament seedings in parentheses. All times are in Eastern.
