= 2022–23 Longwood Lancers men's basketball team =

American college basketball season

2022–23 Longwood Lancers men's basketball
- Conference: Big South Conference
- Record: 20–12 (12–6 Big South)
- Head coach: Griff Aldrich (5th season)
- Assistant coaches: Marty McGillan; Ronnie Thomas; Quinn McDowell
- Home arena: Willett Hall

2022–23 Big South men's basketball standings
	Conf.				Overall
Team	W		L	PCT	W		L	PCT
UNC Asheville †	16	–	2	.889	27	–	8	.771
Longwood	12	–	6	.667	20	–	12	.625
Radford	12	–	6	.667	21	–	15	.583
USC Upstate	10	–	8	.556	16	–	16	.500
Gardner–Webb	10	–	8	.556	15	–	16	.484
Winthrop	10	–	8	.556	15	–	17	.469
Campbell	8	–	10	.444	16	–	18	.471
High Point	6	–	12	.333	14	–	17	.452
Charleston Southern	5	–	13	.278	10	–	21	.323
Presbyterian	1	–	17	.056	5	–	27	.156
† 2023 Big South tournament winner

The 2022–23 Longwood Lancers men's basketball team represented Longwood University in the 2022–23 NCAA Division I men's basketball season. The Lancers, led by fifth-year head coach Griff Aldrich, played their home games at Willett Hall in Farmville, Virginia as members of the Big South Conference.

== Previous season ==
The Lancers finished the 2021–22 season 26–6, 15–1 in Big South play, to win the Big South regular-season championship. They defeated North Carolina A&T, USC Upstate and Winthrop to win the Big South tournament championship. As a result, the Lancers received the conference's automatic bid to the NCAA tournament, the school's first-ever trip to the tournament, where they received the No. 14 seed in the South Region, where they would lose in the first round to Tennessee.

== Roster ==
2022–23 Longwood Lancers men's basketball team
Players
Coaches

Pos.	#	Name	Height	Weight	Year	Hometown
F	0	Leslie Nkereuwem	6 ft 7 in (2.01 m)	225 lb (102 kg)	Sr	Lawrenceville, GA
G	1	Isaiah Wilkins	6 ft 4 in (1.93 m)	220 lb (100 kg)	GS	Winston-Salem, NC
G	2	Nate Lliteras	6 ft 7 in (2.01 m)	210 lb (95 kg)	Jr	Seward, NE
G	3	DeShaun Wade	6 ft 2 in (1.88 m)	200 lb (91 kg)	GS	Virginia Beach, VA
F	4	Zac Watson	6 ft 7 in (2.01 m)	215 lb (98 kg)	GS	Plano, TX
G	5	Jaylani Darden	6 ft 5 in (1.96 m)	185 lb (84 kg)	So	Norfolk, VA
G	10	Knoah Carver	6 ft 3 in (1.91 m)	175 lb (79 kg)	Fr	Charlotte, NC
PG	11	Jaylan Bowen	5 ft 10 in (1.78 m)	165 lb (75 kg)	Fr	Raleigh, NC
PG	13	Mateo Esmeraldo	6 ft 0 in (1.83 m)	165 lb (75 kg)	Fr	Monroe, CT
PG	20	Walyn Napper	6 ft 1 in (1.85 m)	185 lb (84 kg)	Jr	Columbia, SC
F	21	Trey Hicks	6 ft 8 in (2.03 m)	210 lb (95 kg)	So	Louisville, KY
G	23	DA Houston	6 ft 1 in (1.85 m)	212 lb (96 kg)	Jr	Houston, TX
G	24	Cameron O'Conner	6 ft 5 in (1.96 m)	185 lb (84 kg)	Sr	Roanoke, VA
F	25	Michael Christmas	6 ft 6 in (1.98 m)	225 lb (102 kg)	Sr	Virginia Beach, VA
PG	33	Jaylen Williams	6 ft 2 in (1.88 m)	205 lb (93 kg)	GS	Fayetteville, NC
F	35	Jesper Granlund	6 ft 6 in (1.98 m)	210 lb (95 kg)	Jr	Helsinki, Finland
G	44	Radvilas Kneizys	6 ft 4 in (1.93 m)	210 lb (95 kg)	Fr	Klaipėda, Lithuania

Head coach

- Griff Aldrich (Hampden–Sydney)

Assistant coach(es)

- Marty McGillan (UNC Wilmington)
- Ronnie Thomas (Bridgewater)
- Quinn McDowell (William & Mary)

Legend

- (C) Team captain
- (S) Suspended
- (I) Ineligible
- (W) Walk-on
- Injured
- Current redshirt

Roster
Last update: January 6, 2023

== Schedule and results ==
Date time, TV	Rank^{#}	Opponent^{#}	Result	Record	Site (attendance) city, state
Non-conference regular season
November 7, 2022*; 8:30 p.m., SECN+/ESPN+		at No. 20 Alabama	L 54–75	0–1	Coleman Coliseum (10,472); Tuscaloosa, AL
November 11, 2022*; 7:00 p.m., ESPN+		at George Mason	L 69–83	0–2	EagleBank Arena (5,185); Fairfax, VA
November 13, 2022*; 3:00 p.m., ESPN+		Pfeiffer	W 100–68	1–2	Willett Hall (1,432); Farmville, VA
November 18, 2022*; 5:00 p.m., ESPN+		VMI; JK54 Classic	W 90–58	2–2	Willett Hall (1,232); Farmville, VA
November 19, 2022*; 5:00 p.m., ESPN+		Fairleigh Dickinson; JK54 Classic	W 99–83	3–2	Willett Hall (1,321); Farmville, VA
November 20, 2022*; 1:30 p.m., ESPN+		SIU Edwardsville; JK54 Classic	L 56–61	3–3	Willett Hall (1,103); Farmville, VA
November 25, 2022*; 12:00 p.m., ESPN+		Mary Baldwin	W 112–60	4–3	Willett Hall (567); Farmville, VA
November 28, 2022*; 9:00 p.m., WCC Network		at San Diego	L 68–71	4–4	Jenny Craig Pavilion (652); San Diego, CA
December 3, 2022*; 3:00 p.m.		at Delaware State	W 75–49	5–4	Memorial Hall (767); Dover, DE
December 10, 2022*; 4:00 p.m., ESPN+		at Wichita State	L 63–81	5–5	Charles Koch Arena (7,073); Wichita, KS
December 13, 2022*; 2:00 p.m., NEC Front Row		at St. Francis Brooklyn	W 63–57	6–5	Pratt ARC (102); Brooklyn, NY
December 17, 2022*; 1:00 p.m., ESPN+		at The Citadel	W 75–70	7–5	McAlister Field House (789); Charleston, SC
December 20, 2022*; 2:00 p.m., ESPN+		South Carolina State	W 104–77	8–5	Willett Hall (353); Farmville, VA
Big South regular season
December 29, 2022; 3:00 p.m., ESPN+		High Point	W 87–73	9–5 (1–0)	Willett Hall (496); Farmville, VA
December 31, 2022; 2:00 p.m., ESPN+		at Campbell	W 67–42	10–5 (2–0)	Gore Arena (1,132); Buies Creek, NC
January 4, 2023; 7:00 p.m., ESPN+		at Charleston Southern	W 79–74	11–5 (3–0)	Buccaneer Field House (307); North Charleston, SC
January 7, 2023; 4:00 p.m., ESPN+		Winthrop	W 85–71	12–5 (4–0)	Willett Hall (1,323); Farmville, VA
January 12, 2023; 7:00 p.m., ESPNU		at UNC Asheville	L 46–54	12–6 (4–1)	Kimmel Arena (1,164); Asheville, NC
January 14, 2023; 7:00 p.m., ESPN+		USC Upstate	W 72–65	13–6 (5–1)	Willett Hall (1,756); Farmville, VA
January 18, 2023; 7:00 p.m., ESPN+		Gardner–Webb	W 64–59	14–6 (6–1)	Willett Hall (1,548); Farmville, VA
January 21, 2023; 2:00 p.m., ESPN+		at Presbyterian	W 58–56	15–6 (7–1)	Templeton Physical Education Center (460); Clinton, SC
January 25, 2023; 7:00 p.m., ESPN+		at Radford	L 59–63	15–7 (7–2)	Dedmon Center (2,357); Radford, VA
January 28, 2023; 3:00 p.m., ESPN+		Charleston Southern	L 63–75	15–8 (7–3)	Willett Hall (1,734); Farmville, VA
February 1, 2023; 7:00 p.m., ESPN+		at Winthrop	L 74–76	15–9 (7–4)	Winthrop Coliseum (968); Rock Hill, SC
February 4, 2023; 2:00 p.m., ESPN+		Campbell	W 74–50	16–9 (8–4)	Willett Hall (1,638); Farmville, VA
February 8, 2023; 7:00 p.m., ESPN+		Presbyterian	W 66–46	17–9 (9–4)	Willett Hall (1,413); Farmville, VA
February 11, 2023; 7:00 p.m., ESPN+		at High Point	W 70–67	18–9 (10–4)	Qubein Center (3,418); High Point, NC
February 15, 2023; 7:00 p.m., ESPN+		at USC Upstate	L 67–72	18–10 (10–5)	G. B. Hodge Center (421); Spartanburg, SC
February 18, 2023; 3:00 p.m., ESPN+		Radford	W 73–63	19–10 (11–5)	Willett Hall (1,900); Farmville, VA
February 23, 2023; 7:00 p.m., ESPNU		at Gardner–Webb	W 75–63	20–10 (12–5)	Paul Porter Arena (1,084); Boiling Springs, NC
February 25, 2023; 4:30 p.m., ESPN+		UNC Asheville	L 66–76	20–11 (12–6)	Willett Hall (1,900); Farmville, VA
Big South tournament
March 3, 2023; 6:00 p.m., ESPN+	(2)	vs. (7) Campbell; Quarterfinals	L 68–81	20–12	Bojangles Coliseum; Charlotte, NC
*Non-conference game. ^{#}Rankings from AP poll. (#) Tournament seedings in parentheses. All times are in Eastern.
