= 2022–23 USC Upstate Spartans men's basketball team =

American college basketball season

2022–23 USC Upstate Spartans men's basketball

CBI, First Round
- Conference: Big South Conference
- Record: 16–16 (10–8 Big South)
- Head coach: Dave Dickerson (5th season)
- Assistant coaches: Andrew Garcia; Anthony Johnson; Chris Logsdon
- Home arena: G. B. Hodge Center

2022–23 Big South men's basketball standings
	Conf.				Overall
Team	W		L	PCT	W		L	PCT
UNC Asheville †	16	–	2	.889	27	–	8	.771
Longwood	12	–	6	.667	20	–	12	.625
Radford	12	–	6	.667	21	–	15	.583
USC Upstate	10	–	8	.556	16	–	16	.500
Gardner–Webb	10	–	8	.556	15	–	16	.484
Winthrop	10	–	8	.556	15	–	17	.469
Campbell	8	–	10	.444	16	–	18	.471
High Point	6	–	12	.333	14	–	17	.452
Charleston Southern	5	–	13	.278	10	–	21	.323
Presbyterian	1	–	17	.056	5	–	27	.156
† 2023 Big South tournament winner

The 2022–23 USC Upstate Spartans men's basketball team represented the University of South Carolina Upstate in the 2022–23 NCAA Division I men's basketball season. The Spartans, led by fifth-year head coach Dave Dickerson, played their home games at the G. B. Hodge Center in Spartanburg, South Carolina as members of the Big South Conference. They finished the season 15–14, 10–8 in Big South play to finish in a three-way tie for fourth place. They defeated Gardner–Webb in the quarterfinals of the Big South tournament before losing the semifinals to UNC Asheville. The Spartans were invited to the CBI, where they were defeated in the first round by Indiana State.

== Previous season ==
The Spartans finished the 2021–22 season 15–17, 10–6 in Big South play to finish in third place in the South Division. They defeated Charleston Southern in the quarterfinals of the Big South tournament, before losing to eventual champion Longwood in the semifinals. They were invited to The Basketball Classic, where they beat Appalachian State in the first round, before falling to South Alabama in the second round.

== Roster ==
2022–23 USC Upstate Spartans men's basketball team
Players
Coaches

Pos.	#	Name	Height	Weight	Year	Hometown
F	0	Khydarius Smith	6 ft 8 in (2.03 m)	255 lb (116 kg)	Sr	Fort Mill, South Carolina
G/F	1	Nick Alves	6 ft 6 in (1.98 m)	185 lb (84 kg)	Sr	Melbourne, Florida
G	2	Justin Bailey	6 ft 3 in (1.91 m)	185 lb (84 kg)	Fr	Taylors, South Carolina
G	3	Mysta Goodloe	6 ft 5 in (1.96 m)	205 lb (93 kg)	Sr	Winston-Salem, North Carolina
G	4	Jalen Breazeale	5 ft 11 in (1.8 m)	160 lb (73 kg)	So	Roebuck, South Carolina
G/F	5	Jordyn Surratt	6 ft 7 in (2.01 m)	185 lb (84 kg)	Fr	Spartanburg, South Carolina
G/F	10	Ché Evans Jr.	6 ft 7 in (2.01 m)	215 lb (98 kg)	RS So	Baltimore, Maryland
G	11	Jordan Gainey	6 ft 4 in (1.93 m)	175 lb (79 kg)	So	Tucson, Arizona
G/F	12	Trae Broadnax	6 ft 4 in (1.93 m)	200 lb (91 kg)	RS So	Savannah, Georgia
G	13	Andrew McConnell	6 ft 1 in (1.85 m)	170 lb (77 kg)	RS Fr	Buford, Georgia
G	14	Floyd Rideau Jr.	6 ft 5 in (1.96 m)	170 lb (77 kg)	RS So	Lake Wales, Florida
G	22	Thomas Sheida	6 ft 2 in (1.88 m)	180 lb (82 kg)	RS Jr	Bundaberg, Australia
F	23	Dave Dickerson III	6 ft 6 in (1.98 m)	218 lb (99 kg)	RS Jr	Inman, South Carolina
F	35	Ahmir Langlais	6 ft 9 in (2.06 m)	225 lb (102 kg)	RS Jr	Atlanta, Georgia
F	45	Seny N'Diaye	6 ft 10 in (2.08 m)	225 lb (102 kg)	Jr	Dakar, Senegal

Head coach

- Dave Dickerson (Maryland)

Assistant coach(es)

- Andrew Garcia (Tulane)
- Anthony Johnson (Clemson)
- Chris Logsdon (Wooster)

Legend

- (C) Team captain
- (S) Suspended
- (I) Ineligible
- (W) Walk-on
- Injured
- Current redshirt

Roster
Last update: December 22, 2022

== Schedule and results ==
Date time, TV	Rank^{#}	Opponent^{#}	Result	Record	Site (attendance) city, state
Exhibition
November 1, 2022*; 7:00 pm		Erskine	W 77–45	–	G. B. Hodge Center (345); Spartanburg, SC
Non-conference regular season
November 7, 2022*; 7:30 pm, ESPN+		Brevard	W 90–42	1–0	G. B. Hodge Center (833); Spartanburg, SC
November 11, 2022*; 6:30 pm, ACCN		at No. 7 Duke	L 38–84	1–1	Cameron Indoor Stadium (9,314); Durham, NC
November 15, 2022*; 7:00 pm, ACCNX/ESPN+		at Clemson	L 70–81	1–2	Littlejohn Coliseum (5,002); Clemson, SC
November 18, 2022*; 7:30 pm, ESPN+		Coastal Carolina; Collegiate Hoops Roadshow	W 79–78	2–2	G. B. Hodge Center (595); Spartanburg, SC
November 21, 2022*; 9:00 pm, MW Network		at Air Force; Collegiate Hoops Roadshow	L 56–83	2–3	Clune Arena (1,022); Colorado Springs, CO
November 25, 2022*; 4:00 pm, SECN+/ESPN+		at South Carolina	L 53–68	2–4	Colonial Life Arena (9,347); Columbia, SC
November 30, 2022*; 7:00 pm, ESPN+		Columbia International	W 93–59	3–4	G. B. Hodge Center (234); Spartanburg, SC
December 3, 2022*; 5:30 pm, ESPN+		at Western Carolina	W 79–64	4–4	Ramsey Center (1,313); Cullowhee, NC
December 10, 2022*; 3:00 pm, ESPN+		South Carolina State	W 89–84 ^{OT}	5–4	G. B. Hodge Center (417); Spartanburg, SC
December 13, 2022*; 8:30 pm, ACCN		at Florida State	L 63–80	5–5	Donald L. Tucker Center (4,741); Tallahassee, FL
December 20, 2022*; 7:00 pm, ESPN+		at Kennesaw State	L 56–65	5–6	KSU Convocation Center (652); Kennesaw, GA
Big South regular season
December 29, 2022; 5:00 pm, ESPN+		Winthrop	W 70–62	6–6 (1–0)	G. B. Hodge Center (357); Spartanburg, SC
December 31, 2022; 3:00 pm, ESPN+		at Charleston Southern	L 85–90	6–7 (1–1)	Buccaneer Field House (310); North Charleston, SC
January 4, 2023; 7:00 pm, ESPN+		at Radford	W 65–60	7–7 (2–1)	Dedmon Center (942); Radford, VA
January 7, 2022; 3:00 pm, ESPN+		High Point	W 76–57	8–7 (3–1)	G. B. Hodge Center (323); Spartanburg, SC
January 11, 2023; 7:00 pm, ESPN+		Campbell	L 63–78	8–8 (3–2)	G. B. Hodge Center (456); Spartanburg, SC
January 14, 2023; 7:00 pm, ESPN+		at Longwood	L 65–72	8–9 (3–3)	Willett Hall (1,756); Farmville, VA
January 18, 2023; 7:00 pm, ESPN+		Presbyterian	W 61–60	9–9 (4–3)	G. B. Hodge Center (751); Spartanburg, SC
January 21, 2023; 2:00 pm, ESPN+		at UNC Asheville	L 58–64	9–10 (4–4)	Kimmel Arena (1,789); Asheville, NC
January 25, 2023; 7:00 pm, ESPN+		at Gardner–Webb	L 66–78	9–11 (4–5)	Paul Porter Arena (702); Boiling Springs, NC
January 28, 2023; 2:00 pm, ESPN+		Radford	L 52–55	9–12 (4–6)	G. B. Hodge Center; Spartanburg, SC
February 1, 2023; 7:00 pm, ESPN+		at Campbell	L 66–78	9–13 (4–7)	Gore Arena (1,153); Buies Creek, NC
February 4, 2023; 4:00 pm, ESPN+		UNC Asheville	W 76–70	10–13 (5–7)	G. B. Hodge Center (612); Spartanburg, SC
February 8, 2023; 7:00 pm, ESPN+		Charleston Southern	W 77–60	11–13 (6–7)	G. B. Hodge Center (455); Spartanburg, SC
February 11, 2023; 5:00 pm, ESPN+		at Winthrop	W 79–70	12–13 (7–7)	Winthrop Coliseum (1,400); Rock Hill, SC
February 15, 2023; 7:00 pm, ESPN+		Longwood	W 72–67	13–13 (8–7)	G. B. Hodge Center (421); Spartanburg, SC
February 18, 2023; 4:00 pm, ESPN3		at High Point	L 66–81	13–14 (8–8)	Qubein Center (3,019); High Point, NC
February 22, 2023; 7:00 pm, ESPN+		at Presbyterian	W 59–57	14–14 (9–8)	Templeton Physical Education Center (455); Clinton, SC
February 25, 2023; 2:00 pm, ESPN+		Gardner–Webb	W 75–69	15–14 (10–8)	G. B. Hodge Center (833); Spartanburg, SC
Big South tournament
March 3, 2023; 2:00 pm, ESPN+	(4)	vs. (5) Gardner–Webb; Quarterfinals	W 77–76	16–14	Bojangles Coliseum; Charlotte, NC
March 4, 2023; 12:00 pm, ESPN+	(4)	vs. (1) UNC Asheville; Semifinals	L 62–66	16–15	Bojangles Coliseum; Charlotte, NC
College Basketball Invitational
March 18, 2023; 12:00 p.m., FloHoops	(16)	vs. (1) Indiana State; First round	L 62–67	16–16	Ocean Center; Daytona Beach, FL
*Non-conference game. ^{#}Rankings from AP Poll. (#) Tournament seedings in parentheses. All times are in Eastern.
