= 2023 Big South Conference men's basketball tournament =

American collegiate sporting event

- Classification: Division I
- Season: 2022–23
- Teams: 10
- Site: Bojangles Coliseum; Charlotte, North Carolina
- Champions: UNC Asheville (6th title)
- Winning coach: Mike Morrell (1st title)
- Television: ESPN+, ESPN2

2022–23 Big South men's basketball standings
	Conf.				Overall
Team	W		L	PCT	W		L	PCT
UNC Asheville †	16	–	2	.889	27	–	8	.771
Longwood	12	–	6	.667	20	–	12	.625
Radford	12	–	6	.667	21	–	15	.583
USC Upstate	10	–	8	.556	16	–	16	.500
Gardner–Webb	10	–	8	.556	15	–	16	.484
Winthrop	10	–	8	.556	15	–	17	.469
Campbell	8	–	10	.444	16	–	18	.471
High Point	6	–	12	.333	14	–	17	.452
Charleston Southern	5	–	13	.278	10	–	21	.323
Presbyterian	1	–	17	.056	5	–	27	.156
† 2023 Big South tournament winner

The 2023 Big South men's basketball tournament was the postseason men's basketball tournament that ended the 2022–23 NCAA Division I men's basketball season of the Big South Conference. It was held March 1–5 and played at Bojangles Coliseum. The tournament winners, the UNC Asheville Bulldogs, received the automatic bid to the 2023 NCAA tournament.

== Seeds ==
All of the conference teams will compete in the tournament. The top six team will receive a first-round bye. Teams are seeded by record within the conference, with a tiebreaker system to seed teams with identical conference records.

The tiebreakers operate in the following order:

1. Head-to-head record.
2. Record against the top-ranked conference team not involved in the tie, going down the standings until the tie is broken. For this purpose, teams with the same conference record are considered collectively. If two teams were unbeaten or winless against an opponent but did not play the same number of games against that opponent, the tie is not considered broken.

Seed	School	Conference	Overall	Tiebreaker 1	Tiebreaker 2
1	UNC Asheville	16–2	24–7		
2	Longwood	12–6	20–11	2–0 vs. High Point	
3	Radford	12–6	18–13	1–1 vs High Point	
4	USC Upstate	10–8	15–14	3–1 vs. Gardner-Webb/Winthrop	
5	Gardner-Webb	10–8	15–15	2–2 vs. USC Upstate/Winthrop	
6	Winthrop	10–8	15–16	1–3 vs. USC Upstate/Gardner-Webb	
7	Campbell	8–10	13–17		
8	High Point	6–12	14–16		
9	Charleston Southern	5–13	9–20		
10	Presbyterian	1–17	5–26		

== Schedule ==
Game	Time*	Matchup	Score	Channel
Opening round - Wednesday, March 1
1	6:00 pm	No. 8 High Point vs No. 9 Charleston Southern	70–72	ESPN+
2	8:00 pm	No. 7 Campbell vs No. 10 Presbyterian	68–63	ESPN+
Quarterfinals - Friday, March 3
3	12:00 pm	No. 9 Charleston Southern vs No. 1 UNC Asheville	66–75	ESPN+
4	2:00 pm	No. 4 USC Upstate vs No. 5 Gardner-Webb	77–76	ESPN+
5	6:00 pm	No. 7 Campbell vs. No. 2 Longwood	81–68	ESPN+
6	8:00 pm	No. 3 Radford vs No. 6 Winthrop	78–69	ESPN+
Semifinals - Saturday, March 4
7	12:00 pm	No. 1 UNC Asheville vs No. 4 USC Upstate	66–62	ESPN+
8	2:00 pm	No. 7 Campbell vs No. 3 Radford	72–71	ESPN+
Championship - Sunday, March 5
9	1:00 pm	No. 1 UNC Asheville vs No. 7 Campbell	77–73	ESPN2
*Game times in ET

== Bracket ==
First round Wednesday, March 1 ESPN+
8	High Point	70
9	Charleston Southern	72
7	Campbell	68
10	Presbyterian	63

Quarterfinals; Friday, March 3 ESPN+
1	UNC Asheville	75
9	Charleston Southern	66
4	USC Upstate	77
5	Gardner-Webb	76
2	Longwood	68
7	Campbell	81
3	Radford	78
6	Winthrop	69

Semifinals; Saturday, March 4 ESPN+
1	UNC Asheville	66
4	USC Upstate	62
7	Campbell	72
3	Radford	71

Championship; Sunday, March 5 ESPN2
1	UNC Asheville	77
7	Campbell	73
