= 2022–23 Charleston Southern Buccaneers men's basketball team =

American college basketball season

2022–23 Charleston Southern Buccaneers men's basketball
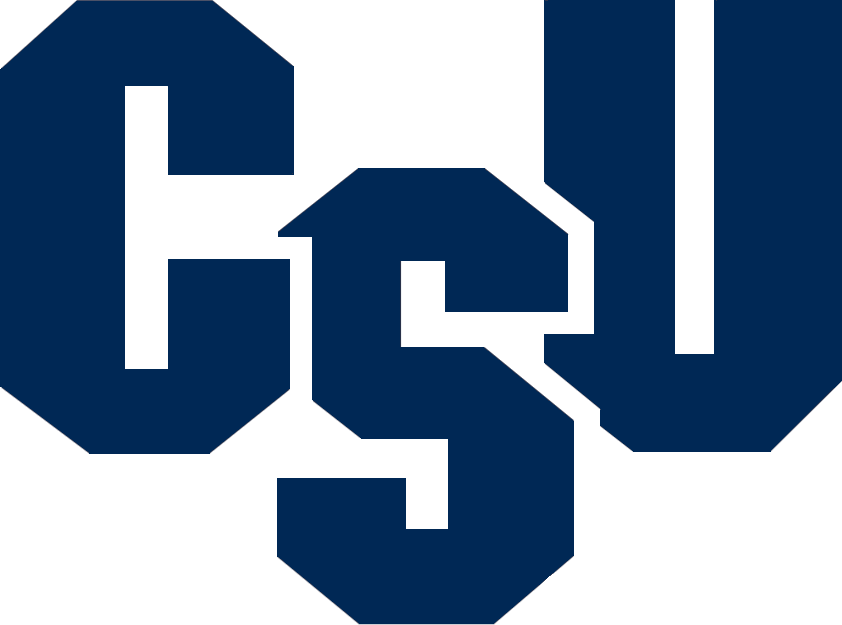
- Conference: Big South Conference
- Record: 10–21 (5–13 Big South)
- Head coach: Barclay Radebaugh (18th season)
- Associate head coach: Thomas Butters
- Assistant coaches: Saah Nimley; Anthony White Jr.
- Home arena: Buccaneer Field House

2022–23 Big South men's basketball standings
| | Conf. | | | | Overall |
| Team | W | | L | PCT | W | | L | PCT |
|---|---|---|---|---|---|---|---|---|
| UNC Asheville † | 16 | – | 2 | .889 | 27 | – | 8 | .771 |
| Longwood | 12 | – | 6 | .667 | 20 | – | 12 | .625 |
| Radford | 12 | – | 6 | .667 | 21 | – | 15 | .583 |
| USC Upstate | 10 | – | 8 | .556 | 16 | – | 16 | .500 |
| Gardner–Webb | 10 | – | 8 | .556 | 15 | – | 16 | .484 |
| Winthrop | 10 | – | 8 | .556 | 15 | – | 17 | .469 |
| Campbell | 8 | – | 10 | .444 | 16 | – | 18 | .471 |
| High Point | 6 | – | 12 | .333 | 14 | – | 17 | .452 |
| Charleston Southern | 5 | – | 13 | .278 | 10 | – | 21 | .323 |
| Presbyterian | 1 | – | 17 | .056 | 5 | – | 27 | .156 |
† 2023 Big South tournament winner

The 2022–23 Charleston Southern Buccaneers men's basketball team represented Charleston Southern University in the 2022–23 NCAA Division I men's basketball season. The Buccaneers, led by 18th-year head coach Barclay Radebaugh, played their home games at the Buccaneer Field House in North Charleston, South Carolina as members of the Big South Conference.

The Buccaneers finished the season 10–21, 5–13 in Big South play, to finish in ninth place. They defeated High Point in the first round of the Big South tournament before falling to the top-seeded and eventual champions UNC Asheville in the quarterfinals.

== Previous season ==
The Buccaneers finished the 2021–22 season 6–25, 1–15 in Big South play, to finish in last place in the South Division. In the Big South tournament, they upset fifth-seeded UNC Asheville in the first round before losing to USC Upstate in the quarterfinals.

== Roster ==
2022–23 Charleston Southern Buccaneers men's basketball team
Players
Coaches

| Pos. | # | Name | Height | Weight | Year | Hometown |
|---|---|---|---|---|---|---|
| G | 0 | Gaddis Heath III | 6 ft 4 in (1.93 m) | 187 lb (85 kg) | Fr | Atlanta, GA |
| F | 1 | Kalib Clinton | 6 ft 4 in (1.93 m) | 207 lb (94 kg) | So | Jefferson, GA |
| G | 2 | Emorie Knox | 6 ft 0 in (1.83 m) | 171 lb (78 kg) | RS So | Myrtle Beach, SC |
| G | 4 | Tyeree Bryan | 6 ft 6 in (1.98 m) | 202 lb (92 kg) | So | Orlando, FL |
| G | 11 | Kheni Briggs | 6 ft 3 in (1.91 m) | 201 lb (91 kg) | Fr | Kannapolis, NC |
| G | 12 | Claudell Harris Jr. | 6 ft 3 in (1.91 m) | 190 lb (86 kg) | So | Hahnville, LA |
| G | 13 | Tahlik Chavez | 6 ft 2 in (1.88 m) | 160 lb (73 kg) | RS Jr | Arlington, TX |
| F | 14 | Taje' Kelly | 6 ft 7 in (2.01 m) | 253 lb (115 kg) | So | Atlanta, GA |
| G | 20 | Tyler Schaafsma | 6 ft 2 in (1.88 m) | 190 lb (86 kg) | So | Charleston, SC |
| F | 21 | Imajae Dodd | 6 ft 7 in (2.01 m) | 268 lb (122 kg) | RS So | Snow Hill, NC |
| G | 22 | RJ Johnson | 6 ft 1 in (1.85 m) | 185 lb (84 kg) | RS Fr | Matthews, NC |
| G | 23 | Finley Simmons | 6 ft 1 in (1.85 m) | 180 lb (82 kg) | Fr | Winston-Salem, NC |
| F | 24 | Reginald Duhart Jr. | 6 ft 9 in (2.06 m) | 210 lb (95 kg) | RS Jr | Boynton Beach, FL |
| F | 34 | Cheikh Faye | 6 ft 8 in (2.03 m) | 216 lb (98 kg) | RS Sr | Fatick, Senegal |
| G | 55 | Tres Berry | 6 ft 4 in (1.93 m) | 183 lb (83 kg) | RS So | Cleveland, TN |

Head coach

- Barclay Radebaugh (East Tennessee State)

Assistant coach(es)

- Thomas Butters (Clemson)
- Saah Nimley (Charleston Southern)
- Anthony White Jr. (Mercer)

Legend

- (C) Team captain
- (S) Suspended
- (I) Ineligible
- (W) Walk-on
- Injured
- Current redshirt

Roster
Last update: January 6, 2023

== Schedule and results ==
| Date time, TV | Rank^{#} | Opponent^{#} | Result | Record | Site (attendance) city, state |
Non-conference regular season
| November 7, 2022*; 8:00 p.m., ESPN+ | | Toccoa Falls | W 83–52 | 1–0 | Buccaneer Field House (855); North Charleston, SC |
| November 10, 2022*; 6:30 p.m., BTN | | at Ohio State | L 56–82 | 1–1 | Value City Arena (8,409); Columbus, OH |
| November 16, 2022*; 7:00 p.m., ESPN+ | | at Tulane | L 79–99 | 1–2 | Devlin Fieldhouse; New Orleans, LA |
| November 21, 2022*; 7:00 p.m., ESPN+ | | Bethune–Cookman | W 78–63 | 2–2 | Buccaneer Field House (126); North Charleston, SC |
| November 25, 2022*; 8:00 p.m., ACCN | | at Virginia Tech | L 64–69 | 2–3 | Cassell Coliseum (8,925); Blacksburg, VA |
| November 30, 2022*; 7:00 p.m., ESPN+ | | The Citadel | L 73–76 | 2–4 | Buccaneer Field House (917); North Charleston, SC |
| December 2, 2022*; 7:00 p.m., ESPN+ | | at South Florida | L 59–79 | 2–5 | Yuengling Center (2,292); Tampa, FL |
| December 5, 2022*; 7:00 p.m., ESPN+ | | Kennesaw State | L 65–76 | 2–6 | Buccaneer Field House (627); North Charleston, SC |
| December 14, 2022*; 8:00 p.m., ESPN+ | | at Tennessee State | W 91–87 | 3–6 | Gentry Complex (537); Nashville, TN |
| December 17, 2022*; 4:00 p.m., ESPN+ | | at Jacksonville | L 63–72 | 3–7 | Swisher Gymnasium (827); Jacksonville, FL |
| December 22, 2022*; 3:00 p.m., ESPN+ | | Kentucky Christian | W 126–67 | 4–7 | Buccaneer Field House (167); North Charleston, SC |
Big South regular season
| December 29, 2022; 5:00 p.m., ESPN+ | | at Gardner–Webb | L 63–83 | 4–8 (0–1) | Paul Porter Arena (494); Boiling Springs, NC |
| December 31, 2022; 3:00 p.m., ESPN+ | | USC Upstate | W 90–85 | 5–8 (1–1) | Buccaneer Field House (310); North Charleston, SC |
| January 4, 2023; 7:00 p.m., ESPN+ | | Longwood | L 74–79 | 5–9 (1–2) | Buccaneer Field House (307); North Charleston, SC |
| January 7, 2023; 2:00 p.m., ESPN+ | | at Presbyterian | W 67–61 | 6–9 (2–2) | Templeton Physical Education Center (333); Clinton, SC |
| January 11, 2023; 7:00 p.m., ESPN+ | | High Point | W 106–69 | 7–9 (3–2) | Buccaneer Field House (792); North Charleston, SC |
| January 14, 2023; 2:00 p.m., ESPN3 | | at Radford | L 70–75 | 7–10 (3–3) | Dedmon Center (1,360); Radford, VA |
| January 18, 2023; 7:00 p.m., ESPN+ | | UNC Asheville | L 63–73 | 7–11 (3–4) | Buccaneer Field House (797); North Charleston, SC |
| January 21, 2023; 5:30 p.m., ESPN+ | | Campbell | L 76–78 ^{OT} | 7–12 (3–5) | Buccaneer Field House (875); North Charleston, SC |
| January 25, 2023; 7:00 p.m., ESPN+ | | at Winthrop | L 64–76 | 7–13 (3–6) | Winthrop Coliseum (1,118); Rock Hill, SC |
| January 28, 2023; 3:00 p.m., ESPN+ | | at Longwood | W 75–63 | 8–13 (4–6) | Willett Hall (1,734); Farmville, VA |
| February 1, 2023; 7:00 p.m., ESPN+ | | Gardner–Webb | L 59–67 | 8–14 (4–7) | Buccaneer Field House (791); North Charleston, SC |
| February 4, 2023; 7:00 p.m., ESPN+ | | at High Point | L 73–81 | 8–15 (4–8) | Qubein Center (6,030); High Point, NC |
| February 8, 2023; 7:00 p.m., ESPN+ | | at USC Upstate | L 60–77 | 8–16 (4–9) | G. B. Hodge Center (455); Spartanburg, SC |
| February 11, 2023; 5:30 p.m., ESPN+ | | Radford | L 71–90 | 8–17 (4–10) | Buccaneer Field House (829); North Charleston, SC |
| February 15, 2023; 7:00 p.m., ESPN+ | | at Campbell | L 51–67 | 8–18 (4–11) | Gore Arena (1,097); Buies Creek, NC |
| February 18, 2023; 5:30 p.m., ESPN+ | | Winthrop | L 67–75 | 8–19 (4–12) | Buccaneer Field House (802); North Charleston, SC |
| February 22, 2023; 7:00 p.m., ESPN+ | | at UNC Asheville | L 62–80 | 8–20 (4–13) | Kimmel Arena (1,362); Asheville, NC |
| February 25, 2023; 4:00 p.m., ESPN+ | | Presbyterian | W 85–59 | 9–20 (5–13) | Buccaneer Field House (777); North Charleston, SC |
Big South tournament
| March 1, 2023; 6:00 p.m., ESPN+ | (9) | vs. (8) High Point; First round | W 72–70 | 10–20 | Bojangles Coliseum (1,177); Charlotte, NC |
| March 3, 2023; 12:00 p.m., ESPN+ | (9) | vs. (1) UNC Asheville; Quarterfinals | L 66–75 | 10–21 | Bojangles Coliseum; Charlotte, NC |
*Non-conference game. ^{#}Rankings from AP poll. (#) Tournament seedings in parentheses. All times are in Eastern.
