= UNC Asheville Bulldogs men's basketball =

American college basketball team

2025–26 UNC Asheville Bulldogs men's basketball team
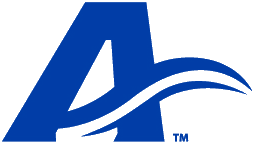
- University: University of North Carolina at Asheville
- Head coach: Mike Morrell (8th season)
- Location: Asheville, North Carolina
- Arena: Kimmel Arena (capacity: 3,200)
- Conference: Big South
- Nickname: Bulldogs
- Colors: Royal blue and white

NCAA Division I tournament appearances
- 2003, 2011, 2012, 2016, 2023

Conference tournament champions
- 1989, 2003, 2011, 2012, 2016, 2023

Conference regular-season champions
- 1997, 1998, 2002, 2008, 2012, 2017, 2018, 2023

The UNC Asheville Bulldogs men's basketball team is the men's basketball team that represents the University of North Carolina at Asheville in Asheville, North Carolina, United States. Their current head coach is Mike Morrell. The school's team currently competes in the Big South Conference. The Bulldogs have appeared five times in the NCAA tournament, most recently in 2023.

== Postseason ==
=== NCAA tournament results ===
The Bulldogs have appeared in the NCAA tournament five times. Their combined record is 2–4. Their highest seed is #15 in 2016 and 2023.

Year	Seed	Round	Opponent	Result
2003	#16	Opening Round; First Round	#16 Texas Southern #1 Texas	W 92–84 ^{OT} L 61–82
2011	#16	First Four; Second Round	#16 Arkansas–Little Rock #1 Pittsburgh	W 81–77 ^{OT} L 51–74
2012	#16	Second Round	#1 Syracuse	L 65–72
2016	#15	First Round	#2 Villanova	L 56–86
2023	#15	First Round	#2 UCLA	L 53–86

=== NIT results ===
The Bulldogs have appeared in the National Invitation Tournament (NIT) two times. Their combined record is 0–2.

Year	Round	Opponent	Result
2008	First Round	Ohio State	L 66–84
2018	First Round	USC	L 98–103 ^{2OT}

=== CBI results ===
The Bulldogs have appeared in the College Basketball Invitational (CBI) one time. Their combined record is 1-1.

Year	Seed	Round	Opponent	Result
2022	#13	First Round; Quarterfinals	#4 Stephen F. Austin #12 Northern Colorado	W 80-68; L 84-87

=== CIT results ===
The Bulldogs have appeared in the CollegeInsider.com Postseason Tournament (CIT) one time. Their record is 0–1.

Year	Round	Opponent	Result
2017	First Round	UT Martin	L 75–89

=== NAIA Tournament results ===
The Bulldogs have appeared in the NAIA Tournament two times. Their combined record is 1–2.

Year	Round	Opponent	Result
1969	First Round; Second Round	Grambling State; Monmouth	W 86–74; L 81–115
1971	First Round	Stephen F. Austin	L 73–91
