= 2023 College Basketball Invitational =

Single-elimination college basketball tournament

- Teams: 16
- Finals site: Ocean Center, Daytona Beach, Florida
- Champions: Charlotte 49ers (1st title)
- Runner-up: Eastern Kentucky Colonels (1st title game)
- Semifinalists: Radford Highlanders (1st semifinal); Southern Utah Thunderbirds (1st semifinal)
- Winning coach: Ron Sanchez (1st title)
- MVP: Brice Williams (Charlotte)
- Attendance: 4,295 (tournament); 771 (championship game)

The 2023 College Basketball Invitational (CBI) was a single-elimination, fully-bracketed men's college basketball postseason tournament featuring 16 National Collegiate Athletic Association (NCAA) Division I teams not selected to participate in the NCAA Division I men's basketball tournament or the National Invitation Tournament (NIT). The 15th edition of the tournament began on March 18 and concluded on March 22. All games were played at Ocean Center in Daytona Beach, Florida. Semifinal and championship games aired on ESPN2. The tournament was won by Charlotte.

== Participating teams ==
Teams in the CBI were seeded 1–16.
Note: Team records are before playing in the tournament

Seed	Team	Conference	Record	Appearance	Last bid
1	Indiana State	Missouri Valley	22–12	2nd	2010
2	San Jose State	Mountain West	20–13	2nd	2011
3	Charlotte	C-USA	18–14	1st	Never
4	Southern Utah	WAC	22–12	1st	Never
5	Duquesne	A-10	20–12	4th	2016
6	Stetson	ASUN	17–13	2nd	2021
7	Tarleton State	WAC	17–16	1st	Never
8	Eastern Kentucky	ASUN	20–13	2nd	2010
9	Cleveland State	Horizon	21–13	1st	Never
10	Radford	Big South	19–14	3rd	2015
11	Milwaukee	Horizon	21–11	2nd	2012
12	Rice	C-USA	18–15	3rd	2022
13	North Alabama	ASUN	18–14	1st	Never
14	Western Carolina	Southern	18–15	2nd	2016
15	Southern Indiana	Ohio Valley	16–16	1st	Never
16	USC Upstate	Big South	16–15	1st	Never

== Schedule ==
Game	Time	Matchup	Score	Television	Attendance	Box score
First round – Saturday, March 18
1	12:00 p.m.	(1) Indiana State vs. (16) USC Upstate	67–62	FloHoops	876	
2	2:30 p.m.	(4) Southern Utah vs. (13) North Alabama	72–50	FloHoops	876	
3	5:00 p.m.	(2) San Jose State vs. (15) Southern Indiana	77–52	FloHoops	876	
4	7:30 p.m.	(3) Charlotte vs. (14) Western Carolina	65–56	FloHoops	876	
First round – Sunday, March 19
5	12:00 p.m.	(8) Eastern Kentucky vs. (9) Cleveland State	91–75^{OT}	FloHoops	922	
6	2:30 p.m.	(5) Duquesne vs. (12) Rice	78–84	FloHoops	922	
7	5:00 p.m.	(7) Tarleton State vs. (10) Radford	70–72^{OT}	FloHoops	922	
8	7:30 p.m.	(6) Stetson vs. (11) Milwaukee	83–87^{OT}	FloHoops	922	
Quarterfinals – Monday, March 20
9	12:00 p.m.	(1) Indiana State vs. (8) Eastern Kentucky	88–89^{OT}	FloHoops	764	
10	2:00 p.m.	(4) Southern Utah vs. (12) Rice	81–79	FloHoops	764	
11	4:30 p.m.	(2) San Jose State vs. (10) Radford	57–67	FloHoops	764	
12	6:30 p.m.	(3) Charlotte vs. (11) Milwaukee	76–65	FloHoops	764	
Semifinals – Tuesday, March 21
13	7:00 p.m.	(8) Eastern Kentucky vs. (4) Southern Utah	108–106^{2OT}	ESPN2	962	
14	9:30 p.m.	(10) Radford vs. (3) Charlotte	56–63	ESPN2	962	
Championship – Wednesday, March 22
15	5:00 p.m.	(8) Eastern Kentucky vs. (3) Charlotte	68–71	ESPN2	771	
Game times in Eastern Time. (#) Rankings denote tournament seed.

== Bracket ==
First round March 18 & 19
1	Indiana State	67
16	USC Upstate	62
8	Eastern Kentucky	91*
9	Cleveland State	75
4	Southern Utah	72
13	North Alabama	50
5	Duquesne	78
12	Rice	84
2	San Jose State	77
15	Southern Indiana	52
7	Tarleton State	70
10	Radford	72*
3	Charlotte	65
14	Western Carolina	56
6	Stetson	83
11	Milwaukee	87*

Quarterfinals; March 20
1	Indiana State	88
8	Eastern Kentucky	89*
4	Southern Utah	81
12	Rice	79
2	San Jose State	57
10	Radford	67
3	Charlotte	76
11	Milwaukee	65

Semifinals; March 21
8	Eastern Kentucky	108**
4	Southern Utah	106
10	Radford	56
3	Charlotte	63

Championship; March 22
8	Eastern Kentucky	68
3	Charlotte	71

*Denotes overtime period
