= 2024–25 Big South Conference men's basketball season =

College basketball season

2024–25 Big South men's basketball season
- League: NCAA Division I
- Sport: Men's basketball
- Number of teams: 9

Regular season
- Season champions: High Point
- Season MVP: Taje' Kelly, Charleston Southern

Tournament
- Champions: High Point

Basketball seasons
- ← 2023–24 2025–26 →

2024–25 Big South men's basketball standings
	Conf.				Overall
Team	W		L	PCT	W		L	PCT
High Point †	14	–	2	.875	29	–	6	.829
UNC Asheville	11	–	5	.688	21	–	11	.656
Winthrop	11	–	5	.688	23	–	11	.676
Radford	9	–	7	.563	20	–	13	.606
Presbyterian	7	–	9	.438	14	–	19	.424
Longwood	7	–	9	.438	18	–	14	.563
Charleston Southern	6	–	10	.375	10	–	22	.313
Gardner–Webb	5	–	11	.313	11	–	20	.355
USC Upstate	2	–	14	.125	6	–	26	.188
† 2025 Big South tournament winner

The 2024–25 Big South Conference men's basketball season began with practices in September 2024 and will end with the 2025 Big South Conference men's basketball tournament in March 2025.

== Head coaches ==
=== Coaching Changes ===
Jeremy Luther was promoted to head coach at Gardner-Webb on March 27, 2024.

Marty Richter was named head coach at USC Upstate on April 5, 2024.

=== Coaches ===
Team	Head coach	Previous job	Season	Overall record	Big South record	NCAA Tournaments
Charleston Southern	Saah Nimley	Charleston Southern (asst.)	2nd	14–29 (.326)	8–13 (.381)	0
Gardner-Webb	Jeremy Luther	Gardner-Webb (asst.)	1st	10–19 (.345)	5–11 (.313)	0
High Point	Alan Huss	Creighton	2nd	53–14 (.791)	27–5 (.844)	1
Longwood	Griff Aldrich	Hampden-Sydney (asst.)	7th	127–99 (.562)	64–56 (.533)	2
Presbyterian	Quinton Ferrell	Charleston (asst.)	6th	62–120 (.341)	30–71 (.297)	0
Radford	Darris Nichols	Florida (asst.)	4th	67–62 (.519)	33–33 (.500)	0
USC Upstate	Marty Richter	Drake (asst.)	1st	6–25 (.194)	2–14 (.125)	0
UNC Asheville	Mike Morrell	Texas (asst.)	7th	115–98 (.540)	68–48 (.586)	1
Winthrop	Mark Prosser	Western Carolina	4th	76–51 (.598)	43–23 (.652)	0

Notes:

- Season and record numbers are inclusive of the 2024–25 season.

== Preseason ==
=== Preseason coaches poll ===
2024–25 Big South Preseason Coaches Poll
Rank	Team (First place votes)	Points
1	High Point (17)	161
2	Winthrop (1)	134
3	Longwood	121
4	UNC Asheville	104
5	Charleston Southern	98
6	Gardner-Webb	63
7	Radford	56
8	Presbyterian	54
9	USC Upstate	19

=== Preseason All-Conference Team ===
First team
Kezza Giffa, High Point
Kelton Talford, Winthrop
Kimani Hamilton, High Point
Juslin Bodo Bodo, High Point
Taje' Kelly, Charleston Southern
Preseason MVP: Kezza Giffa, High Point

== Regular season ==
=== Player of the Week awards ===
Week	Player of the Week	Rookie of the Week
1	Darryl Simmons, Gardner–Webb Kory Mincey, Presbyterian	Mister Dean, USC Upstate
2	Jarvis Moss, Radford	Mister Dean (2), USC Upstate
3	Toyaz Solomon, UNC Asheville	Zion Walker, Radford
4	Taje' Kelly, Charleston Southern	Carmelo Adkins, USC Upstate
5	RJ Johnson, Charleston Southern	Carmelo Adkins (2), USC Upstate
6	Breylin Garcia, USC Upstate	Kameron Taylor, UNC Asheville
7	Taje' Kelly (2), Charleston Southern	Mister Dean (3), USC Upstate
8	Jordan Marsh, UNC Asheville	Zion Walker (2), Radford
9	Kelton Telford, Winthrop	Mister Dean (4), USC Upstate Paul Jones, Winthrop
10	Jordan Marsh (2), UNC Asheville Taje' Kelly (3), Charleston Southern	Iverson King, Presbyterian
11	Kobe Stewart, Presbyterian	Iverson King (2), Presbyterian
12	Darryl Simmons (2), Gardner–Webb	Kameron Taylor (2), UNC Asheville
13	Juslin Bodo Bodo, High Point	Carmelo Adkins (3), USC Upstate
14	Taje' Kelly (4), Charleston Southern	Josh Ibukunoluwa, High Point
15	Kezza Giffa, High Point	Mister Dean (5), USC Upstate
16	Bryce Baker, Winthrop	Mister Dean (6), USC Upstate

School	POTW	FOTW
Charleston Southern	5	0
Gardner–Webb	2	0
High Point	2	1
Longwood	0	0
Presbyterian	2	2
Radford	1	2
UNC Asheville	3	2
USC Upstate	1	9
Winthrop	2	1

== Conference awards ==
**2025 Big South Conference Men's Basketball Individual Awards**
Award	Recipient(s)
Player of the Year	Taje' Kelly, Charleston Southern
Coach of the Year	Alan Huss, High Point
Defensive Player of the Year	Juslin Bodo Bodo, High Point
Freshman of the Year	Mister Dean, USC Upstate
Newcomer of the Year	Jordan Marsh, UNC Asheville

**2025 Big South Conference Men's Basketball All-Conference Teams**
First Team	Second Team	Honorable Mention	All Freshman
Taje' Kelly, CHARS; Jordan Marsh, UNCA; Kelton Talford, WINT; Kezza Giffa, HP; Kimani Hamilton, HP	Kobe Stewart, PRES; Toyaz Solomon, UNCA; D'Maurian Williams, HP; Darryl Simmons II, G-W; Juslin Bodo Bodo, HP	Kory Mincy, PRES; Josh Banks, UNCA; KJ Doucet, WINT; Jarvis Moss, RAD; Kasen Harrison, WINT	Mister Dean, USC-UP; Kameron Taylor, UNCA; JPaul Joes III, WINT; Carmelo Adkins, USC-UP; Iverson King, PRES

**2025 Big South Men's Basketball**
**All-Tournament Team**
**Bobby Pettiford, High Point**
Kezza Giffa, High Point
Kimani Hamilton, High Point
Kelton Talford, Winthrop
Kasen Harrison, Winthrop
**Bold** denotes MVP

== Postseason ==
=== Big South tournament ===
The conference tournament will be played from March 5 to March 9, 2025 at the Freedom Hall Civic Center in Johnson City, Tennessee. The top seven teams receive a first round bye.

=== NCAA Tournament ===
As the conference champion, High Point received an automatic bid to the 2025 NCAA Division I men's basketball tournament, their first ever NCAA tournament appearance.

Seed	Region	School	First Four	First round	Second round	Sweet Sixteen	Elite Eight	Final Four	Championship
13	Midwest	High Point	—	L 63-75 vs. (4) Purdue	―	―	―	―	―

=== NCAA Tournament ===
School	Last NCAA Tournament Appearance	Seed	Result
Charleston Southern	1997	15	Lost First Round
Gardner–Webb	2019	16	Lost First Round
High Point	2025	13	Lost First Round
Longwood	2024	16	Lost First Round
Presbyterian	--	--	--
Radford	2018	16	Lost First Round
UNC Asheville	2023	15	Lost First Round
USC Upstate	--	--	--
Winthrop	2021	12	Lost First Round
