= 2024–25 Winthrop Eagles men's basketball team =

American college basketball season

2024–25 Winthrop Eagles men's basketball
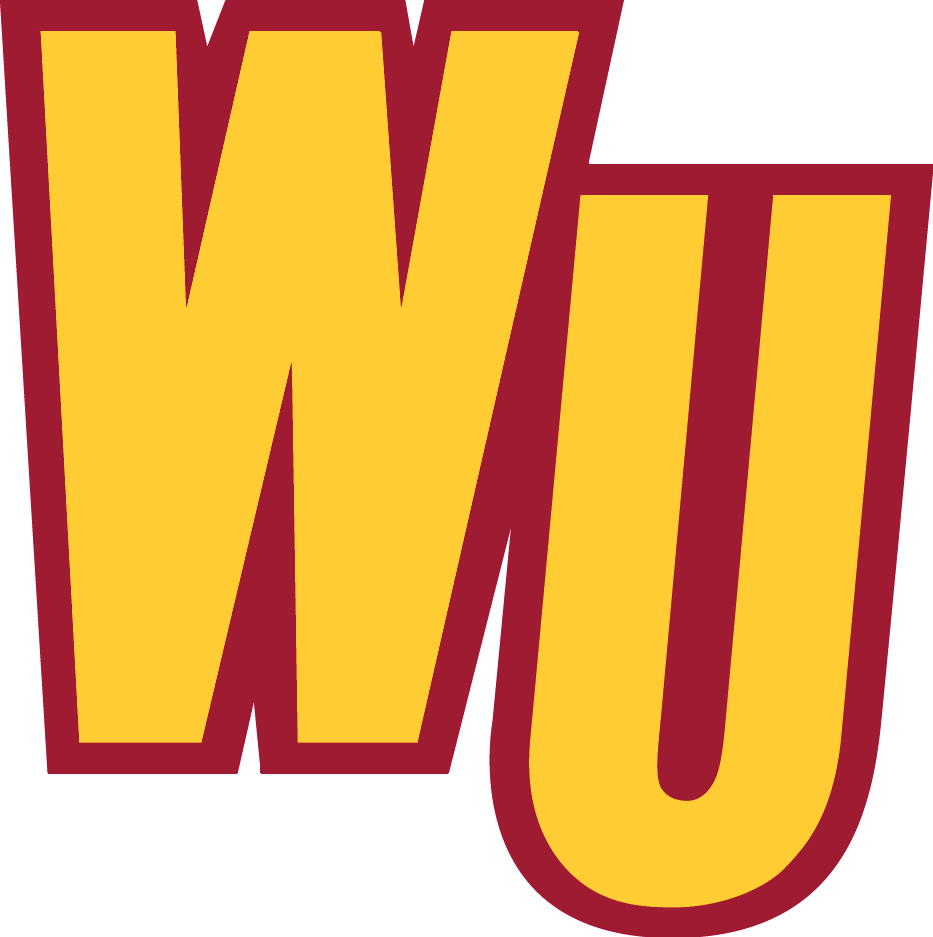
- Conference: Big South Conference
- Record: 23–11 (11–5 Big South)
- Head coach: Mark Prosser (4th season)
- Associate head coach: Tony Rack; Monty Sanders
- Assistant coaches: Mitchell Hill; Kaylin Johnson; Matt Erps
- Home arena: Winthrop Coliseum

2024–25 Big South men's basketball standings
	Conf.				Overall
Team	W		L	PCT	W		L	PCT
High Point †	14	–	2	.875	29	–	6	.829
UNC Asheville	11	–	5	.688	21	–	11	.656
Winthrop	11	–	5	.688	23	–	11	.676
Radford	9	–	7	.563	20	–	13	.606
Presbyterian	7	–	9	.438	14	–	19	.424
Longwood	7	–	9	.438	18	–	14	.563
Charleston Southern	6	–	10	.375	10	–	22	.313
Gardner–Webb	5	–	11	.313	11	–	20	.355
USC Upstate	2	–	14	.125	6	–	26	.188
† 2025 Big South tournament winner

The 2024–25 Winthrop Eagles men's basketball team represented Winthrop University during the 2024–25 NCAA Division I men's basketball season. The Eagles, led by fourth-year head coach Mark Prosser, played their home games at the Winthrop Coliseum in Rock Hill, South Carolina as members of the Big South Conference.

== Previous season ==
The Eagles finished the 2023–24 season 17–15, 8–8 in Big South play to finish in fourth place. They were defeated by eventual tournament champions Longwood in the quarterfinals of the Big South tournament.

== Roster ==
2024–25 Winthrop Eagles men's basketball team
Players
Coaches

Pos.	#	Name	Height	Weight	Year	Previous school	Hometown
G	1	Isaiah Wilson	6 ft 1 in (1.85 m)	180 lb (82 kg)	Sr	Richmond	Pittsburgh, Pennsylvania
G	2	Ryan Jolly	6 ft 3 in (1.91 m)	180 lb (82 kg)	GS	Piedmont	Martinez, Georgia
G	3	Paul Jones III	6 ft 4 in (1.93 m)	170 lb (77 kg)	Fr	Combine Academy	Suffolk, Virginia
F	4	Kelton Talford	6 ft 7 in (2.01 m)	200 lb (91 kg)	Sr	Great Falls High School	Great Falls, South Carolina
F	5	Yoro Diallo	6 ft 8 in (2.03 m)	210 lb (95 kg)	RS So	Moeller High School	Cincinnati, Ohio
G	8	Cam Christy	6 ft 4 in (1.93 m)	200 lb (91 kg)	Jr	Mount St. Joseph	Walton, Kentucky
G	10	Nick Johnson	6 ft 4 in (1.93 m)	200 lb (91 kg)	GS	New Hampshire	Bronx, New York
G	11	Kasen Harrison	6 ft 2 in (1.88 m)	200 lb (91 kg)	Sr	Lamar	Beaumont, Texas
F	12	K.J. Doucet	6 ft 7 in (2.01 m)	230 lb (104 kg)	Sr	Fort Valley State	Austell, Georgia
G	13	Clay Howard	6 ft 3 in (1.91 m)	180 lb (82 kg)	Jr	Aiken High School	Aiken, South Carolina
G	14	Noah Van Bibber	6 ft 5 in (1.96 m)	190 lb (86 kg)	So	Concord Academy	DeBary, Florida
F	15	Tommy Kamarad	6 ft 8 in (2.03 m)	205 lb (93 kg)	Sr	Arkansas Tech	Buford, Georgia
F	21	Tai Hamilton	6 ft 10 in (2.08 m)	200 lb (91 kg)	So	William & Mary	Charlotte, North Carolina
G	22	Henry Harrison	5 ft 11 in (1.8 m)	175 lb (79 kg)	So	Lewisburg High School	Lewisburg, Pennsylvania
C	51	Logan Duncomb	6 ft 10 in (2.08 m)	230 lb (104 kg)	Jr	Xavier	Cincinnati, Ohio
G	55	Bryce Baker	6 ft 5 in (1.96 m)	200 lb (91 kg)	Jr	Old Dominion	Mooresville, North Carolina

Head coach

- Mark Prosser (Marist)

Assistant coach(es)

- Tony Rack (Northern Kentucky)
- Monty Sanders (Elon)
- Mitchell Hill (Tennessee Tech)
- Kaylin Johnson (Samford)
- Matt Erps (Winthrop)

Legend

- (C) Team captain
- (S) Suspended
- (I) Ineligible
- (W) Walk-on
- Injured
- Current redshirt

Roster
Last update: October 26, 2024

== Schedule and results ==
Date time, TV	Rank^{#}	Opponent^{#}	Result	Record	Site (attendance) city, state
Non-conference regular season
November 4, 2024*; 6:30 pm, ESPN+		Piedmont	W 125–65	1–0	Winthrop Coliseum (1,246); Rock Hill, SC
November 9, 2024*; 12:00 pm, ESPN+		Little Rock	W 82–67	2–0	Winthrop Coliseum (2,078); Rock Hill, SC
November 11, 2024*; 7:00 pm, ACCNX		at Virginia Tech	L 52–58	2–1	Cassell Coliseum (4,157); Blacksburg, VA
November 15, 2024*; 5:00 pm, ESPN+		William & Mary; Rock Hill Classic	W 86–85	3–1	Rock Hill Sports & Event Center (777); Rock Hill, SC
November 16, 2024*; 5:00 pm, ESPN+		Georgia Southern; Rock Hill Classic	L 87–89	3–2	Rock Hill Sports & Event Center (1,597); Rock Hill, SC
November 17, 2024*; 2:30 pm, ESPN+		North Carolina Central; Rock Hill Classic	W 77–75	4–2	Rock Hill Sports & Event Center (1,390); Rock Hill, SC
November 22, 2024*; 7:00 pm, ACCNX		at Louisville	L 61–76	4–3	KFC Yum! Center (12,462); Louisville, KY
November 25, 2024*; 6:30 pm, ESPN+		LIU	W 87–65	5–3	Winthrop Coliseum (1,119); Rock Hill, SC
November 27, 2024*; 6:30 pm, ESPN+		Averett	W 99–56	6–3	Winthrop Coliseum (1,289); Rock Hill, SC
December 3, 2024*; 7:00 pm, ESPN+		at Queens	W 86–78	7–3	Curry Arena (575); Charlotte, NC
December 7, 2024*; 7:00 pm, ESPN+		Coastal Carolina	W 96–89	8–3	Winthrop Coliseum (1,798); Rock Hill, SC
December 12, 2024*; 6:30 pm, ESPN+		Bob Jones	W 103–55	9–3	Rock Hill Sports & Event Center (1,328); Rock Hill, SC
December 17, 2024*; 7:00 pm, ACCNX		at Florida State	L 64–82	9–4	Donald L. Tucker Center (4,354); Tallahassee, FL
December 21, 2024*; 2:00 pm, ESPN+		Mercer	W 102–97	10–4	Winthrop Coliseum (1,587); Rock Hill, SC
December 29, 2024*; 4:00 pm, BTN		at Indiana	L 68–77	10–5	Simon Skjodt Assembly Hall (14,499); Bloomington, IN
Big South regular season
January 2, 2025; 4:00 pm, ESPN+		USC Upstate	W 95–76	11–5 (1–0)	Winthrop Coliseum (1,448); Rock Hill, SC
January 4, 2025; 4:30 pm, ESPN+		at Radford	L 67–87	11–6 (1–1)	Dedmon Center (916); Radford, VA
January 8, 2025; 7:00 pm, ESPN+		at Gardner–Webb	L 83–89	11–7 (1–2)	Paul Porter Arena (625); Boiling Springs, NC
January 11, 2025; 2:00 pm, ESPN+		Longwood	W 95–76	12–7 (2–2)	Winthrop Coliseum (2,004); Rock Hill, SC
January 15, 2025; 6:30 pm, ESPN+		Charleston Southern	W 102–97 ^{3OT}	13–7 (3–2)	Winthrop Coliseum (1,667); Rock Hill, SC
January 18, 2025; 2:00 pm, ESPN+		at UNC Asheville	L 84–93	13–8 (3–3)	Kimmel Arena (1,812); Asheville, NC
January 25, 2025; 2:00 pm, ESPN+		at High Point	L 62–84	13–9 (3–4)	Qubein Center (4,623); High Point, NC
January 29, 2025; 6:30 pm, ESPN+		Presbyterian	W 76–67	14–9 (4–4)	Winthrop Coliseum (1,884); Rock Hill, SC
February 1, 2025; 2:00 pm, ESPN+		Gardner–Webb	W 96–93	15–9 (5–4)	Winthrop Coliseum (2,217); Rock Hill, SC
February 5, 2025; 7:00 pm, ESPN+		at Charleston Southern	W 83–65	16–9 (6–4)	Buccaneer Field House (850); North Charleston, SC
February 8, 2025; 2:00 pm, ESPN+		at USC Upstate	W 105–95	17–9 (7–4)	G. B. Hodge Center (368); Spartanburg, SC
February 12, 2025; 6:30 pm, ESPN+		Radford	W 78–74	18–9 (8–4)	Winthrop Coliseum (1,909); Rock Hill, SC
February 15, 2025; 2:00 pm, ESPN+		High Point	L 66–88	18–10 (8–5)	Winthrop Coliseum (2,736); Rock Hill, SC
February 19, 2025; 7:00 pm, ESPN+		at Presbyterian	W 81–77	19–10 (9–5)	Templeton Center (370); Clinton, SC
February 27, 2025; 7:00 pm, ESPNU		at Longwood	W 85–59	20–10 (10–5)	Joan Perry Brock Center (2,389); Farmville, VA
March 1, 2025; 4:00 pm, ESPN+		UNC Asheville	W 103–90	21–10 (11–5)	Winthrop Coliseum (3,085); Rock Hill, SC
Big South tournament
March 7, 2025; 8:30 p.m., ESPN+	(3)	vs. (6) Longwood; Quarterfinals	W 88–79	22–10	Freedom Hall Civic Center (1,705); Johnson City, TN
March 8, 2025; 2:30 p.m., ESPN+	(3)	vs. (2) UNC Asheville; Semifinals	W 86–67	23–10	Freedom Hall Civic Center; Johnson City, TN
March 9, 2025; 12:00 pm, ESPN2	(3)	vs. (1) High Point; Championship	L 69–81	23–11	Freedom Hall Civic Center; Johnson City, TN
*Non-conference game. ^{#}Rankings from AP Poll. (#) Tournament seedings in parentheses. All times are in Eastern.
