= 2024–25 Gardner–Webb Runnin' Bulldogs men's basketball team =

American college basketball season

2024–25 Gardner–Webb Runnin' Bulldogs men's basketball
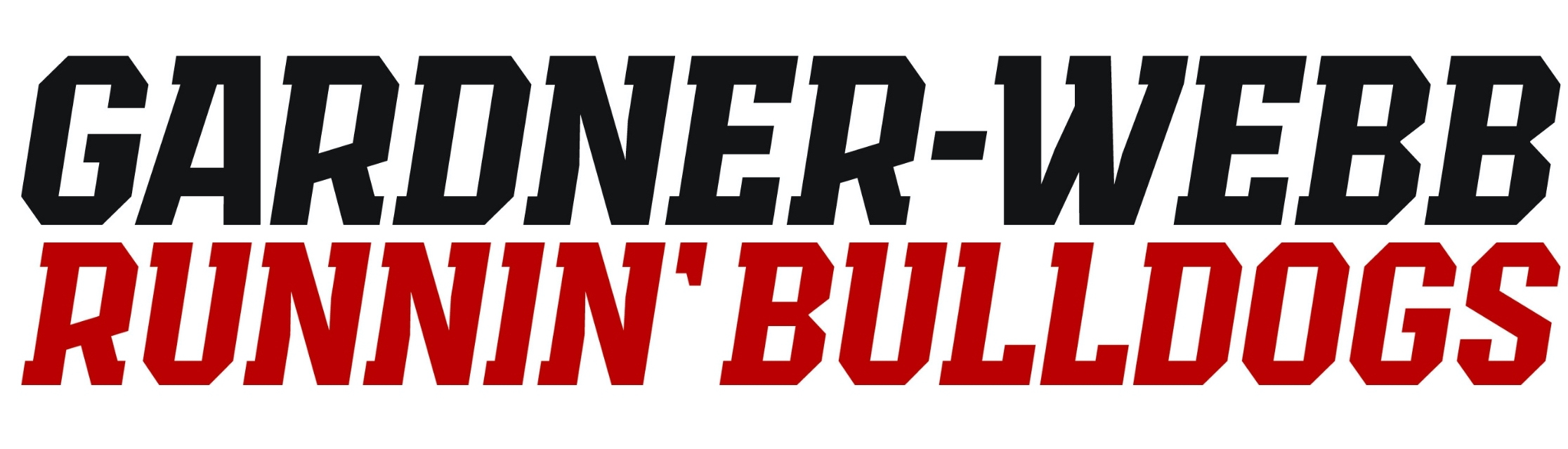

Cancún Challenge Mayan Division champions
- Conference: Big South Conference
- Record: 11–20 (5–11 Big South)
- Head coach: Jeremy Luther (1st season)
- Associate head coach: Jake DeLaney
- Assistant coaches: Adam Sweeney; Christian Turner; Tannor Kraus
- Home arena: Paul Porter Arena

2024–25 Big South men's basketball standings
	Conf.				Overall
Team	W		L	PCT	W		L	PCT
High Point †	14	–	2	.875	29	–	6	.829
UNC Asheville	11	–	5	.688	21	–	11	.656
Winthrop	11	–	5	.688	23	–	11	.676
Radford	9	–	7	.563	20	–	13	.606
Presbyterian	7	–	9	.438	14	–	19	.424
Longwood	7	–	9	.438	18	–	14	.563
Charleston Southern	6	–	10	.375	10	–	22	.313
Gardner–Webb	5	–	11	.313	11	–	20	.355
USC Upstate	2	–	14	.125	6	–	26	.188
† 2025 Big South tournament winner

The 2024–25 Gardner–Webb Runnin' Bulldogs men's basketball team represented Gardner–Webb University during the 2024–25 NCAA Division I men's basketball season. The Runnin' Bulldogs, led by first-year head coach Jeremy Luther, played their home games at Paul Porter Arena in Boiling Springs, North Carolina as members of the Big South Conference.

== Previous season ==
The Runnin' Bulldogs finished the 2023–24 season 17–16, 11–5 in Big South play to finish in third place. They defeated Presbyterian, before falling to UNC Asheville in the semifinals of the Big South tournament.

== Roster ==
2024–25 Gardner–Webb Runnin' Bulldogs men's basketball team
Players
Coaches

Pos.	#	Name	Height	Weight	Year	Hometown
G	0	Deshawn Goodwyn	6 ft 5 in (1.96 m)	195 lb (88 kg)	Jr	Richmond, Virginia
G	1	Anthony Seldon	6 ft 6 in (1.98 m)	220 lb (100 kg)	GS	Boston, Massachusetts
G	2	Brendan Mykalcio	6 ft 7 in (2.01 m)	208 lb (94 kg)	Sr	New City, New York
G	3	Jamaine Mann	6 ft 6 in (1.98 m)	230 lb (104 kg)	GS	Atlanta, Georgia
G	4	Pharell Boyogueno	6 ft 6 in (1.98 m)	215 lb (98 kg)	Jr	Greenville, South Carolina
F	5	Ademide Badmus	6 ft 7 in (2.01 m)	257 lb (117 kg)	Sr	Lynn, Massachusetts
G	6	Taku Youngblood	6 ft 2 in (1.88 m)	180 lb (82 kg)	Jr	Yokohama, Japan
F	7	Race Herr	6 ft 10 in (2.08 m)	200 lb (91 kg)	So	Odessa, Texas
G	8	Darryl Simmons II	5 ft 11 in (1.8 m)	160 lb (73 kg)	So	Detroit, Michigan
G	10	Chance Thacker	6 ft 4 in (1.93 m)	210 lb (95 kg)	Jr	Suwanee, Georgia
G	11	Jacob Hudson	6 ft 2 in (1.88 m)	185 lb (84 kg)	Fr	Houston, Texas
G	12	Cameron Gales	6 ft 0 in (1.83 m)	170 lb (77 kg)	Fr	Shelby, North Carolina
G	14	Shahar Lazar	6 ft 2 in (1.88 m)	215 lb (98 kg)	RS So	Emunim, Israel
G	21	Paul Lindberg	6 ft 4 in (1.93 m)	195 lb (88 kg)	So	Houston, Texas
G	23	Colin Hawkins	6 ft 3 in (1.91 m)	225 lb (102 kg)	Fr	Colorado Springs, Colorado
F	24	Isaiah Richards	6 ft 10 in (2.08 m)	225 lb (102 kg)	RS Sr	Brooklyn, New York
G	35	Isaiah Hicks	6 ft 0 in (1.83 m)	185 lb (84 kg)	RS So	Shelby, North Carolina

Head coach

- Jeremy Luther (North Greenville)

Assistant coach(es)

- Jake DeLaney (Gardner–Webb)
- Adam Sweeney (Gardner–Webb)
- Christian Turner (Gardner–Webb)
- Tannor Kraus (Missouri)

Legend

- (C) Team captain
- (S) Suspended
- (I) Ineligible
- (W) Walk-on
- Injured
- Current redshirt

Roster
Last update: October 22, 2024

== Schedule and results ==
Date time, TV	Rank^{#}	Opponent^{#}	Result	Record	Site (attendance) city, state
Non-conference regular season
November 4, 2024*; 7:00 pm, SECN+/ESPN+		at No. 12 Tennessee	L 64–80	0–1	Thompson–Boling Arena (17,813); Knoxville, TN
November 8, 2024*; 1:00 pm		at North Carolina Central	W 88–82	1–1	McDougald–McLendon Arena (437); Durham, NC
November 11, 2024*; 7:00 pm, ACCNX/ESPN+		at Pittsburgh	L 64–83	1–2	Petersen Events Center (6,229); Pittsburgh, PA
November 16, 2024*; 7:00 pm, ESPN+		Elon	W 80–79	2–2	Paul Porter Arena (350); Boiling Springs, NC
November 19, 2024*; 7:00 pm, ESPN+		at Charlotte	L 54–60	2–3	Dale F. Halton Arena (2,956); Charlotte, NC
November 26, 2024*; 12:30 pm		vs. Southeastern Louisiana; Cancún Challenge Mayan Semifinals	W 73–69	3–3	Hard Rock Hotel Riviera Maya (103); Cancún, Mexico
November 27, 2024*; 3:00 pm		vs. Bethune–Cookman; Cancún Challenge Mayan Division championships	W 79–64	4–3	Hard Rock Hotel Riviera Maya (200); Cancún, Mexico
November 29, 2024*; 4:00 pm, ESPN+		at Belmont; Cancún Challenge campus game	L 74–83	4–4	Curb Event Center (1,211); Nashville, TN
December 4, 2024*; 7:00 pm, ESPN+		at Wofford	L 64–88	4–5	Jerry Richardson Indoor Stadium (929); Spartanburg, SC
December 7, 2024*; 2:00 pm, ESPN+		North Carolina Central	L 77–78	4–6	Paul Porter Arena (375); Boiling Springs, NC
December 14, 2024*; 2:00 pm, ESPN+		Queens	L 83–85	4–7	Paul Porter Arena (750); Boiling Springs, NC
December 17, 2024*; 7:00 pm, ESPN+		at Georgia Southern	L 81–86	4–8	Hill Convocation Center (1,611); Statesboro, GA
December 21, 2024*; 3:00 pm, ESPN+		at East Carolina	W 84–79	5–8	Williams Arena (3,672); Greenville, NC
Big South regular season
January 2, 2025; 1:00 pm, ESPN+		at Charleston Southern	L 63–72	5–9 (0–1)	Buccaneer Field House (235); North Charleston, SC
January 4, 2025; 2:00 pm, ESPN+		Presbyterian	W 63–61	6–9 (1–1)	Paul Porter Arena (570); Boiling Springs, NC
January 8, 2025; 7:00 pm, ESPN+		Winthrop	W 89–83	7–9 (2–1)	Paul Porter Arena (625); Boiling Springs, NC
January 11, 2025; 7:00 pm, ESPN+		at High Point	L 55–96	7–10 (2–2)	Qubein Center (3,490); High Point, NC
January 15, 2025; 7:00 pm, ESPN+		at Radford	L 75–79	7–11 (2–3)	Dedmon Center (1,324); Radford, VA
January 18, 2025; 4:00 pm, ESPN+		USC Upstate	W 97–68	8–11 (3–3)	Paul Porter Arena (389); Boiling Springs, NC
January 22, 2025; 7:00 pm, ESPN+		UNC Asheville	L 53–61	8–12 (3–4)	Paul Porter Arena (1,725); Boiling Springs, NC
January 29, 2025; 7:00 pm, ESPN+		Longwood	W 92–87	9–12 (4–4)	Paul Porter Arena (378); Boiling Springs, NC
February 1, 2025; 7:00 pm, ESPN+		at Winthrop	L 93–96	9–13 (4–5)	Winthrop Coliseum (2,217); Rock Hill, SC
February 6, 2025; 6:30 pm, ESPNU		at UNC Asheville	L 70–78	9–14 (4–6)	Kimmel Arena (1,123); Asheville, NC
February 8, 2025; 2:00 pm, ESPN+		Charleston Southern	L 72–79	9–15 (4–7)	Paul Porter Arena (2,349); Boiling Springs, NC
February 15, 2025; 3:00 pm, ESPN+		at USC Upstate	W 96–87	10–15 (5–7)	G. B. Hodge Center (565); Spartanburg, SC
February 19, 2025; 7:00 pm, ESPN+		at Longwood	L 77–90	10–16 (5–8)	Joan Perry Brock Center (1,325); Farmville, VA
February 22, 2025; 2:00 pm, ESPN+		High Point	L 67–90	10–17 (5–9)	Paul Porter Arena (2,876); Boiling Springs, NC
February 26, 2025; 7:00 pm, ESPN+		Radford	L 56–63	10–18 (5–10)	Paul Porter Arena (1,155); Boiling Springs, NC
March 1, 2025; 7:00 pm, ESPN+		at Presbyterian	L 57–68	10–19 (5–11)	Templeton Center; Clinton, SC
Big South tournament
March 5, 2025; 7:30 pm, ESPN+	(8)	vs. (9) USC Upstate; First round	W 83–63	11–19	Freedom Hall Civic Center; Johnson City, TN
March 7, 2025; 12:00 pm, ESPN+	(8)	vs. (1) High Point; Quarterfinals	L 64–85	11–20	Freedom Hall Civic Center; Johnson City, TN
*Non-conference game. ^{#}Rankings from AP Poll. (#) Tournament seedings in parentheses. All times are in Eastern.
