= 2024–25 Longwood Lancers men's basketball team =

American college basketball season

2024–25 Longwood Lancers men's basketball
- Conference: Big South Conference
- Record: 18–14 (7–9 Big South)
- Head coach: Griff Aldrich (7th season)
- Associate head coach: Marty McGillan
- Assistant coaches: Ronnie Thomas; Aaron Smith; Matt Sholtis; Myo Baxter-Bell; Joe Lupetin Odri Dedolli
- Home arena: Joan Perry Brock Center

2024–25 Big South men's basketball standings
	Conf.				Overall
Team	W		L	PCT	W		L	PCT
High Point †	14	–	2	.875	29	–	6	.829
UNC Asheville	11	–	5	.688	21	–	11	.656
Winthrop	11	–	5	.688	23	–	11	.676
Radford	9	–	7	.563	20	–	13	.606
Presbyterian	7	–	9	.438	14	–	19	.424
Longwood	7	–	9	.438	18	–	14	.563
Charleston Southern	6	–	10	.375	10	–	22	.313
Gardner–Webb	5	–	11	.313	11	–	20	.355
USC Upstate	2	–	14	.125	6	–	26	.188
† 2025 Big South tournament winner

The 2024–25 Longwood Lancers men's basketball team represented Longwood University during the 2024–25 NCAA Division I men's basketball season. The Lancers, led by seventh-year head coach Griff Aldrich, played their home games at the Joan Perry Brock Center in Farmville, Virginia as members of the Big South Conference.

== Previous season ==
The Lancers finished the 2023–24 season 21–14, 6–10 in Big South play to finish in a tie for fifth place. They defeated Winthrop, upset top-seeded High Point, and UNC Asheville to win just their second Big South tournament championship and earn the Big South's automatic bid to the NCAA tournament. In the NCAA tournament, they received the #16 seed in the South Region, where they would fall to #1 region seed Houston in the First Round.

== Roster ==
2024–25 Longwood Lancers men's basketball team
Players
Coaches

Pos.	#	Name	Height	Weight	Year	Previous school	Hometown
F	0	Johan Nziemi	6 ft 6 in (1.98 m)	233 lb (106 kg)	Sr	Independence CC	Manhattan, New York
G	1	Kyrell Luc	5 ft 11 in (1.8 m)	175 lb (79 kg)	Sr	St. Bonaventure	Dorchester, Massachusetts
G	2	Dom Payne	6 ft 2 in (1.88 m)	210 lb (95 kg)	Fr	Trinity HS	Trinity, North Carolina
G	3	Colby Garland	6 ft 1 in (1.85 m)	195 lb (88 kg)	So	Drake	Magnolia, Arkansas
G/F	4	Emanuel Richards	6 ft 4 in (1.93 m)	228 lb (103 kg)	So	Christ School	Irmo, South Carolina
G	5	KJ McClurg	6 ft 3 in (1.91 m)	185 lb (84 kg)	RS Jr	California (PA)	Morgantown, West Virginia
F	6	Precious Idiaru	6 ft 9 in (2.06 m)	240 lb (109 kg)	RS So	Kansas City	Speyer, Germany
G	8	Leo Nordberg	6 ft 1 in (1.85 m)	175 lb (79 kg)	So	Torpan Pojat	Helsinki, Finland
F	11	Trey Hicks	6 ft 9 in (2.06 m)	238 lb (108 kg)	Sr	The Hill School	Louisville, Kentucky
G	14	Angelo Brizzi	6 ft 3 in (1.91 m)	193 lb (88 kg)	RS Jr	Davidson	Warrenton, Virginia
G	21	Stark Jones	6 ft 3 in (1.91 m)	195 lb (88 kg)	Fr	Cave Spring HS	Roanoke, Virginia
G	22	DJ Jefferson	6 ft 5 in (1.96 m)	220 lb (100 kg)	RS So	Tennessee	Richardson, Texas
G	23	Kris Mickens	6 ft 5 in (1.96 m)	200 lb (91 kg)	So	Tuskegee	Clemmons, North Carolina
G	24	Jaylen Benard	6 ft 2 in (1.88 m)	208 lb (94 kg)	So	Cypress Ranch HS	Houston, Texas
F	25	Michael Christmas	6 ft 6 in (1.98 m)	228 lb (103 kg)	GS	James Madison	Virginia Beach, Virginia
F	34	Elijah Tucker	6 ft 8 in (2.03 m)	237 lb (108 kg)	RS Jr	Xavier	Canton, Georgia

Head coach

- Griff Aldrich (Hampden–Sydney)

Assistant coach(es)

- Marty McGillan (UNC Wilmington)
- Ronnie Thomas (Bridgewater)
- Aaron Smith (Prairie View A&M)
- Matt Sholtis (Charlotte)
- Myo Baxter-Bell (Liberty)
- Joe Lupetin (Marist)
- Odri Dedolli (Mount St. Mary's)

Legend

- (C) Team captain
- (S) Suspended
- (I) Ineligible
- (W) Walk-on
- Injured
- Current redshirt

Roster
Last update: October 24, 2024

== Schedule and results ==
Date time, TV	Rank^{#}	Opponent^{#}	Result	Record	Site (attendance) city, state
Non-conference regular season
November 4, 2024*; 7:30 pm, ESPN+		Randolph	W 79–68	1–0	Joan Perry Brock Center (2,358); Farmville, VA
November 9, 2024*; 3:00 pm, ESPN+		Morgan State	W 84–66	2–0	Joan Perry Brock Center (3,246); Farmville, VA
November 13, 2024*; 7:00 pm, ESPN+		Milwaukee	W 76–62	3–0	Joan Perry Brock Center (1,326); Farmville, VA
November 16, 2024*; 1:00 pm, ESPN+		UT Martin	W 64–62	4–0	Joan Perry Brock Center (1,473); Farmville, VA
November 19, 2024*; 6:00 pm, ESPN+		at Binghamton	W 66–60	5–0	Dr. Bai Lee Court (1,283); Vestal, NY
November 22, 2024*; 12:30 pm, ESPN+		vs. UAB; Paradise Jam Quarterfinal	W 89–81	6–0	Sports and Fitness Center (1,535); St. Thomas, USVI
November 24, 2024*; 5:30 pm, ESPN+		vs. McNeese; Paradise Jam Semifinal	L 69–84	6–1	Sports and Fitness Center; St. Thomas, USVI
November 25, 2024*; 5:30 pm, ESPN+		vs. Kansas State; Paradise Jam 3rd place game	L 64–80	6–2	Sports and Fitness Center; St. Thomas, USVI
December 1, 2024*; 5:00 pm, ESPN+		Regent	W 108–55	7–2	Joan Perry Brock Center (1,068); Farmville, VA
December 5, 2024*; 7:00 pm, ESPN+		Maryland Eastern Shore	W 80–76	8–2	Joan Perry Brock Center (1,932); Farmville, VA
December 8, 2024*; 6:30 pm, ESPN+		Mary Baldwin	W 97–40	9–2	Joan Perry Brock Center (1,941); Farmville, VA
December 14, 2024*; 2:00 pm, ESPN+		North Carolina Central	L 70–77	9–3	Joan Perry Brock Center (2,024); Farmville, VA
December 18, 2024*; 7:00 pm, FloHoops		at Campbell	W 77–55	10–3	Gore Arena (1,077); Buies Creek, NC
December 20, 2024*; 7:00 pm, ESPN+		at North Carolina Central	W 82–67	11–3	McDougald–McLendon Arena (265); Durham, NC
December 29, 2024*; 2:00 pm, ACCNX		at SMU	L 82–98	11–4	Moody Coliseum (5,220); University Park, TX
Big South regular season
January 2, 2025; 2:00 pm, ESPN+		at Presbyterian	L 60–68	11–5 (0–1)	Templeton Center (343); Clinton, SC
January 4, 2025; 7:00 pm, ESPN+		Charleston Southern	W 83–78	12–5 (1–1)	Joan Perry Brock Center (1,738); Farmville, VA
January 8, 2025; 7:00 pm, ESPN+		UNC Asheville	W 85–76	13–5 (2–1)	Joan Perry Brock Center (1,487); Farmville, VA
January 11, 2025; 2:00 pm, ESPN+		at Winthrop	L 76–95	13–6 (2–2)	Winthrop Coliseum (2,004); Rock Hill, SC
January 16, 2025; 7:00 pm, ESPNU		High Point	W 82–80	14–6 (3–2)	Joan Perry Brock Center (3,128); Farmville, VA
January 22, 2025; 7:00 pm, ESPN+		at Radford	W 77–74	15–6 (4–2)	Dedmon Center (1,411); Radford, VA
January 25, 2025; 3:00 pm, ESPN+		USC Upstate	W 80–54	16–6 (5–2)	Joan Perry Brock Center (2,637); Farmville, VA
January 29, 2025; 7:00 pm, ESPN+		at Gardner–Webb	L 87–92	16–7 (5–3)	Paul Porter Arena (378); Boiling Springs, NC
February 1, 2025; 2:00 pm, ESPN+		at Charleston Southern	L 85–89	16–8 (5–4)	Buccaneer Field House (500); North Charleston, SC
February 8, 2025; 3:00 pm, ESPN+		Radford	L 69–71	16–9 (5–5)	Joan Perry Brock Center (3,072); Farmville, VA
February 13, 2025; 7:00 pm, ESPNU		at High Point	L 72–83	16–10 (5–6)	Qubein Center (5,988); High Point, NC
February 15, 2025; 3:00 pm, ESPN+		Presbyterian	L 68–77	16–11 (5–7)	Joan Perry Brock Center (2,231); Farmville, VA
February 19, 2025; 7:00 pm, ESPN+		Gardner–Webb	W 90–77	17–11 (6–7)	Joan Perry Brock Center (1,325); Farmville, VA
February 22, 2025; 2:00 pm, ESPN+		at UNC Asheville	L 82–87	17–12 (6–8)	Kimmel Arena (2,093); Asheville, NC
February 27, 2025; 7:00 pm, ESPNU		Winthrop	L 59–85	17–13 (6–9)	Joan Perry Brock Center (2,389); Farmville, VA
March 1, 2025; 2:00 pm, ESPN+		at USC Upstate	W 83–66	18–13 (7–9)	G. B. Hodge Center (471); Spartanburg, SC
Big South tournament
March 7, 2025; 8:30 pm, ESPN+	(6)	vs. (3) Winthrop; Quarterfinals	L 79–88	18–14	Freedom Hall Civic Center (1,705); Johnson City, TN
*Non-conference game. ^{#}Rankings from AP Poll. (#) Tournament seedings in parentheses. All times are in Eastern.
