= 2024–25 Charleston Southern Buccaneers men's basketball team =

American college basketball season

2024–25 Charleston Southern Buccaneers men's basketball
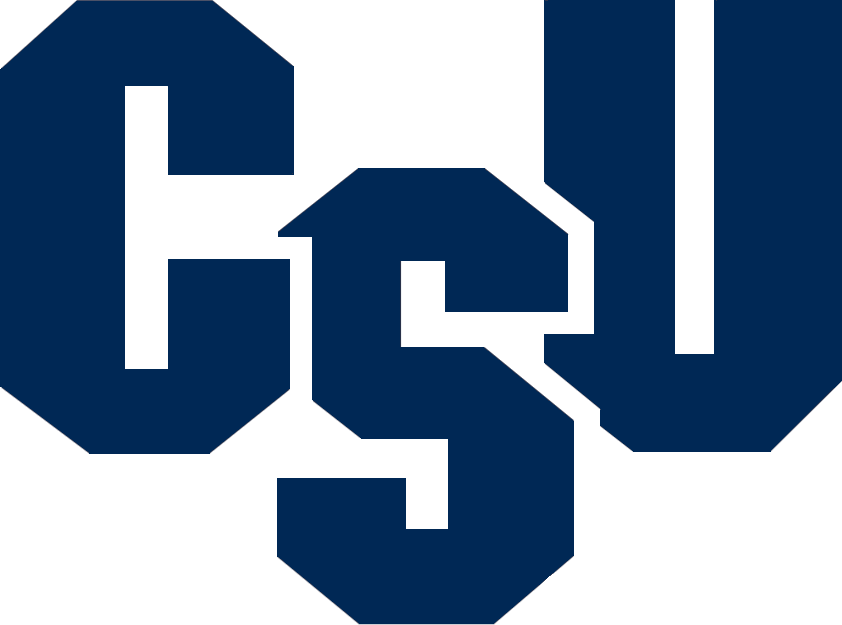
- Conference: Big South Conference
- Record: 10–22 (6–10 Big South)
- Head coach: Saah Nimley (1st season)
- Associate head coach: Mike Howland
- Assistant coaches: Trey Johnson; Nate Louis; Michael Ervin
- Home arena: Buccaneer Field House

2024–25 Big South men's basketball standings
	Conf.				Overall
Team	W		L	PCT	W		L	PCT
High Point †	14	–	2	.875	29	–	6	.829
UNC Asheville	11	–	5	.688	21	–	11	.656
Winthrop	11	–	5	.688	23	–	11	.676
Radford	9	–	7	.563	20	–	13	.606
Presbyterian	7	–	9	.438	14	–	19	.424
Longwood	7	–	9	.438	18	–	14	.563
Charleston Southern	6	–	10	.375	10	–	22	.313
Gardner–Webb	5	–	11	.313	11	–	20	.355
USC Upstate	2	–	14	.125	6	–	26	.188
† 2025 Big South tournament winner

The 2024–25 Charleston Southern Buccaneers men's basketball team represented Charleston Southern University during the 2024–25 NCAA Division I men's basketball season. The Buccaneers, led by head coach Saah Nimley in his first full season, played their home games at the Buccaneer Field House in North Charleston, South Carolina as members of the Big South Conference.

== Previous season ==
The Buccaneers finished the 2023–24 season 10–20, 6–10 in Big South play to finish in a three-way tie for fifth place. They were defeated by UNC Asheville in the quarterfinals of the Big South tournament.

Just seven games into the season, head coach Barclay Radebaugh announced that he would be stepping down, ending his 19-year tenure with the team, with associate head coach Saah Nimley serving as the interim head coach for the remainder of the season. On March 4, 2024, the school announced that they would be removing the interim tag, and naming Nimley the new head coach.

== Roster ==
2024–25 Charleston Southern Buccaneers men's basketball team
Players
Coaches

Pos.	#	Name	Height	Weight	Year	Previous school	Hometown
F	0	Ellis Graham	6 ft 9 in (2.06 m)	200 lb (91 kg)	Fr	Gray Collegiate Academy	New Zion, SC
G	1	Lamar Oden Jr.	6 ft 6 in (1.98 m)	220 lb (100 kg)	GS	Drexel	Douglasville, GA
F	2	Taje' Kelly	6 ft 7 in (2.01 m)	240 lb (109 kg)	Sr	Grayson High School	Atlanta, GA
G	4	DJ Patrick	6 ft 6 in (1.98 m)	200 lb (91 kg)	RS Sr	South Florida	Powder Springs, GA
G	5	Derrick Harris Jr.	6 ft 3 in (1.91 m)	180 lb (82 kg)	RS Jr	Georgia Southern	Camilla, GA
G	6	Anthony Gause	6 ft 3 in (1.91 m)	175 lb (79 kg)	Fr	Milton High School	St. Louis, MO
G	7	Daylen Berry	6 ft 4 in (1.93 m)	175 lb (79 kg)	RS Jr	Charlotte	Raleigh, NC
F	8	Jaylon Gibson	6 ft 10 in (2.08 m)	225 lb (102 kg)	GS	UNC Greensboro	Zebulon, NC
G	10	Keenan Wilkins	5 ft 10 in (1.78 m)	155 lb (70 kg)	Fr	Christ School	Hendersonville, NC
G	11	A'lahn Sumler	6 ft 4 in (1.93 m)	185 lb (84 kg)	Jr	Northern Kentucky	Waterbury, CT
F	15	Cooper Kowalski	6 ft 8 in (2.03 m)	200 lb (91 kg)	Fr	First Baptist School	Charleston, SC
G	22	RJ Johnson	6 ft 1 in (1.85 m)	185 lb (84 kg)	RS Jr	Holy Cross	Matthews, NC
F	23	Reis Jones	6 ft 10 in (2.08 m)	235 lb (107 kg)	Jr	Florida SouthWestern	Fort Washington, MD
F	30	Thompson Camara	6 ft 7 in (2.01 m)	210 lb (95 kg)	Jr	Frank Phillips College	Otukpo, Nigeria
F	34	Lase Olalere	6 ft 10 in (2.08 m)	230 lb (104 kg)	RS Fr	Charleston Math & Science	Charleston, SC

Head coach

- Saah Nimley (Charleston Southern)

Assistant coach(es)

- Mike Howland (DePauw)
- Trey Johnson (Charleston Southern)
- Nate Louis (Charleston Southern)
- Michael Ervin (Appalachian State)

Legend

- (C) Team captain
- (S) Suspended
- (I) Ineligible
- (W) Walk-on
- Injured
- Current redshirt

Roster
Last update: October 22, 2024

== Schedule and results ==
Date time, TV	Rank^{#}	Opponent^{#}	Result	Record	Site (attendance) city, state
Non-conference regular season
November 4, 2024*; 7:00 pm, ACCNX/ESPN+		at Clemson	L 64–91	0–1	Littlejohn Coliseum (7,463); Clemson, SC
November 7, 2024*; 7:00 pm, ESPN+		at North Florida	L 66–90	0–2	UNF Arena (2,019); Jacksonville, FL
November 11, 2024*; 7:00 pm, ESPN+		Morris	W 108–50	1–2	Buccaneer Field House (754); North Charleston, SC
November 15, 2024*; 1:00 pm		vs. UT Rio Grande Valley; Greenbrier Tip-Off River Division Semifinals	L 76–86	1–3	Colonial Hall (275); White Sulphur Springs, WV
November 16, 2024*; 12:00 pm		vs. VMI; Greenbrier Tip-Off River Division third place game	L 69–80	1–4	Colonial Hall (474); White Sulphur Springs, WV
November 19, 2024*; 8:00 pm, SECN+		at LSU; Greenbrier Tip-Off campus game	L 68–77	1–5	Pete Maravich Assembly Center (6,442); Baton Rouge, LA
November 23, 2024*; 2:00 pm, ESPN+		Furman	L 46–67	1–6	Buccaneer Field House (784); North Charleston, SC
November 27, 2024*; 7:30 pm, ACCNX/ESPN+		at Georgia Tech	L 67–91	1–7	McCamish Pavilion (3,414); Atlanta, GA
November 30, 2024*; 2:00 pm, ACCNX/ESPN+		at Miami (FL)	W 83–79	2–7	Watsco Center (3,244); Coral Gables, FL
December 3, 2024*; 7:00 pm, ESPN+		UT Martin	W 83–68	3–7	Buccaneer Field House (789); North Charleston, SC
December 6, 2024*; 7:00 pm, ESPN+		at Davidson	L 72–73	3–8	John M. Belk Arena (2,339); Davidson, NC
December 9, 2024*; 7:00 pm		at South Carolina State	L 63–82	3–9	SHM Memorial Center (155); Orangeburg, SC
December 19, 2024*; 6:00 pm, ESPN+		at North Alabama	L 69–86	3–10	CB&S Bank Arena (1,287); Florence, AL
December 22, 2024*; 3:30 pm, SECN		at Georgia	L 65–81	3–11	Stegeman Coliseum (8,368); Athens, GA
December 28, 2024*; 1:00 pm, ESPN+		Columbia International	W 95–89	4–11	Buccaneer Field House (856); North Charleston, SC
Big South regular season
January 2, 2025; 1:00 pm, ESPN+		Gardner–Webb	W 72–63	5–11 (1–0)	Buccaneer Field House (235); North Charleston, SC
January 4, 2025; 7:00 pm, ESPN+		at Longwood	L 78–83	5–12 (1–1)	Joan Perry Brock Center (1,738); Farmville, VA
January 8, 2025; 7:00 pm, ESPN+		High Point	L 79–93	5–13 (1–2)	Buccaneer Field House (456); North Charleston, SC
January 15, 2025; 6:30 pm, ESPN+		at Winthrop	L 97–102 ^{3OT}	5–14 (1–3)	Winthrop Coliseum (1,667); Rock Hill, SC
January 18, 2025; 2:00 pm, ESPN+		Radford	W 58–54	6–14 (2–3)	Buccaneer Field House (785); North Charleston, SC
January 22, 2025; 7:00 pm, ESPN+		at Presbyterian	L 61–71	6–15 (2–4)	Templeton Center (421); Clinton, SC
January 25, 2025; 3:30 pm, ESPN+		UNC Asheville	L 61–69	6–16 (2–5)	Buccaneer Field House (875); North Charleston, SC
January 29, 2025; 6:00 pm, ESPN+		at USC Upstate	W 82–75	7–16 (3–5)	G. B. Hodge Center (818); Spartanburg, SC
February 1, 2025; 2:00 pm, ESPN+		Longwood	W 89–85	8–16 (4–5)	Buccaneer Field House (500); North Charleston, SC
February 5, 2025; 7:00 pm, ESPN+		Winthrop	L 65–83	8–17 (4–6)	Buccaneer Field House (850); North Charleston, SC
February 8, 2025; 2:00 pm, ESPN+		at Gardner–Webb	W 79–72	9–17 (5–6)	Paul Porter Arena (2,349); Boiling Springs, NC
February 12, 2025; 7:00 pm, ESPN+		Presbyterian	W 71–70	10–17 (6–6)	Buccaneer Field House (768); North Charleston, SC
February 15, 2025; 4:30 pm, ESPN+		at UNC Asheville	L 72–75	10–18 (6–7)	Kimmel Arena (2,312); Asheville, NC
February 19, 2025; 7:00 pm, ESPN+		at High Point	L 60–83	10–19 (6–8)	Qubein Center (2,793); High Point, NC
February 22, 2025; 2:00 pm, ESPN+		USC Upstate	L 69–79	10–20 (6–9)	Buccaneer Field House (823); North Charleston, SC
March 1, 2025; 2:00 pm, ESPN+		at Radford	L 60–76	10–21 (6–10)	Dedmon Center (1,423); Radford, VA
Big South tournament
March 7, 2025; 6:00 pm, ESPN+	(7)	vs. (2) UNC Asheville; Quarterfinals	L 60–80	10–22	Freedom Hall Civic Center; Johnson City, TN
*Non-conference game. ^{#}Rankings from AP Poll. (#) Tournament seedings in parentheses. All times are in Eastern.
