= 2024–25 USC Upstate Spartans men's basketball team =

American college basketball season

2024–25 USC Upstate Spartans men's basketball
- Conference: Big South Conference
- Record: 6–26 (2–14 Big South)
- Head coach: Marty Richter (1st season)
- Assistant coaches: Bryan Martin; Nashad Mackey; Anthony Murphy
- Home arena: G. B. Hodge Center

2024–25 Big South men's basketball standings
	Conf.				Overall
Team	W		L	PCT	W		L	PCT
High Point †	14	–	2	.875	29	–	6	.829
UNC Asheville	11	–	5	.688	21	–	11	.656
Winthrop	11	–	5	.688	23	–	11	.676
Radford	9	–	7	.563	20	–	13	.606
Presbyterian	7	–	9	.438	14	–	19	.424
Longwood	7	–	9	.438	18	–	14	.563
Charleston Southern	6	–	10	.375	10	–	22	.313
Gardner–Webb	5	–	11	.313	11	–	20	.355
USC Upstate	2	–	14	.125	6	–	26	.188
† 2025 Big South tournament winner

The 2024–25 USC Upstate Spartans men's basketball team represented the University of South Carolina Upstate during the 2024–25 NCAA Division I men's basketball season. The Spartans, led by first-year head coach Marty Richter, played their home games at the G. B. Hodge Center in Spartanburg, South Carolina as members of the Big South Conference.

== Previous season ==
The Spartans finished the 2023–24 season 10–20, 5–11 in Big South play to finish in a tie for eighth place. They were defeated by Radford in the first round of the Big South tournament.

On March 25, 2024, head coach Dave Dickerson announced that he would be stepping down, in order to take the assistant head coaching position at Ohio State, a position he held prior to his hiring at USC Upstate. On April 5, the school announced that former Drake assistant coach Marty Richter would become the Spartans' new head coach.

== Roster ==
2024–25 USC Upstate Spartans men's basketball team
Players
Coaches

Pos.	#	Name	Height	Weight	Year	Previous school	Hometown
G	0	Andrew McConnell	6 ft 2 in (1.88 m)	170 lb (77 kg)	RS Jr	James Madison	Buford, Georgia
G	1	Kanye Jones	6 ft 5 in (1.96 m)	190 lb (86 kg)	Sr	Buffalo	Orlando, Florida
G	2	Isaiah Skinner	6 ft 6 in (1.98 m)	200 lb (91 kg)	RS Jr	Mt. San Jacinto College	Palm Desert, California
G	3	Brit Harris	6 ft 4 in (1.93 m)	170 lb (77 kg)	Jr	Grand Valley State	Gary, Indiana
G	4	Carmelo Adkins	6 ft 4 in (1.93 m)	180 lb (82 kg)	Fr	PHHoenix Prep	Lubbock, Texas
G	5	Mister Dean	6 ft 6 in (1.98 m)	210 lb (95 kg)	Fr	Sunrise Christian Academy	Miami, Florida
F	8	Nic Book	6 ft 8 in (2.03 m)	205 lb (93 kg)	Fr	Westfield High School	Christchurch, New Zealand
G	11	Karmani Gregory	6 ft 1 in (1.85 m)	170 lb (77 kg)	RS So	Florida SouthWestern	Palmetto, Florida
F	12	Breylin Garcia	6 ft 6 in (1.98 m)	220 lb (100 kg)	Jr	Daytona State	La Romana, Dominican Republic
G	14	Jamari Briggs	6 ft 5 in (1.96 m)	—	Fr	Christ School	Hartsville, South Carolina
F	15	Jordan Terhune	6 ft 8 in (2.03 m)	—	Fr	South St. Paul High School	St. Cloud, Minnesota
G	21	CJ Rich	5 ft 10 in (1.78 m)	155 lb (70 kg)	So	Spring Valley High School	Columbia, South Carolina
F	22	Daniel Helterhoff	6 ft 10 in (2.08 m)	240 lb (109 kg)	Jr	Our Lady of the Lake	Cologne, Germany
G	24	Chico Johnson	6 ft 3 in (1.91 m)	180 lb (82 kg)	So	Drake	Toledo, Ohio

Head coach

- Marty Richter (Simpson)

Assistant coach(es)

- Bryan Martin (Simpson)
- Nashad Mackey (Embry–Riddle)
- Anthony Murphy (Drake)

Legend

- (C) Team captain
- (S) Suspended
- (I) Ineligible
- (W) Walk-on
- Injured
- Current redshirt

Roster
Last update: October 25, 2024

== Schedule and results ==
Date time, TV	Rank^{#}	Opponent^{#}	Result	Record	Site (attendance) city, state
Exhibition
October 29, 2024*; 7:00 pm		North Greenville	W 99–62	—	G. B. Hodge Center (258); Spartanburg, SC
Non-conference regular season
November 4, 2024*; 7:00 pm, ACCNX		at NC State	L 66–97	0–1	Lenovo Center; Raleigh, NC
November 6, 2024*; 7:00 pm, ESPN+		Piedmont	W 103–70	1–1	G. B. Hodge Center (629); Spartanburg, SC
November 8, 2024*; 7:00 pm, ACCNX		at Virginia Tech	L 74–93	1–2	Cassell Coliseum (6,327); Blacksburg, VA
November 13, 2024*; 7:00 pm, ACCNX		at Wake Forest	L 80–85	1–3	LJVM Coliseum (8,482); Winston-Salem, NC
November 15, 2024*; 7:00 pm, ESPN+		UNC Wilmington	L 85–89	1–4	G. B. Hodge Center (596); Spartanburg, SC
November 19, 2024*; 7:00 pm, ESPN+		Southern Wesleyan	W 95–63	2–4	G. B. Hodge Center (417); Spartanburg, SC
November 22, 2024*; 7:00 pm, ESPN+		at East Tennessee State; ETSU MTE	L 76–87	2–5	Freedom Hall Civic Center (2,689); Johnson City, TN
November 23, 2024*; 6:00 pm		vs. Queens; ETSU MTE	L 74–98	2–6	Freedom Hall Civic Center (317); Johnson City, TN
November 26, 2024*; 8:00 pm, BTN		at Iowa	L 77–110	2–7	Carver–Hawkeye Arena (7,732); Iowa City, IA
November 30, 2024*; 2:00 pm		at Coastal Carolina	L 51–73	2–8	HTC Center (1,242); Conway, SC
December 4, 2024*; 7:00 pm, ESPN+		Brevard	W 91–60	3–8	G. B. Hodge Center (580); Spartanburg, SC
December 7, 2024*; 3:00 pm, ESPN+		at Western Carolina	W 74–68	4–8	Ramsey Center (1,409); Cullowhee, NC
December 14, 2024*; 2:00 pm, SECN+		at South Carolina	L 53–73	4–9	Colonial Life Arena (11,092); Columbia, SC
December 18, 2024*; 6:00 pm, ESPN+		South Carolina State	L 70–85	4–10	G. B. Hodge Center (495); Spartanburg, SC
December 21, 2024*; 1:00 pm, ESPN+		Youngstown State	L 64–72	4–11	G. B. Hodge Center (165); Spartanburg, SC
Big South regular season
January 2, 2025; 4:00 pm, ESPN+		at Winthrop	L 76–95	4–12 (0–1)	Winthrop Coliseum (1,448); Rock Hill, SC
January 8, 2025; 7:00 pm, ESPN+		Presbyterian	W 77–67	5–12 (1–1)	G. B. Hodge Center (270); Spartanburg, SC
January 11, 2025; 2:00 pm, ESPN+		Radford	L 67–80	5–13 (1–2)	G. B. Hodge Center (372); Spartanburg, SC
January 15, 2025; 6:30 pm, ESPN+		at UNC Asheville	L 92–93	5–14 (1–3)	Kimmel Arena (1,481); Asheville, NC
January 18, 2025; 4:00 pm, ESPN+		at Gardner–Webb	L 68–97	5–15 (1–4)	Paul Porter Arena (389); Boiling Springs, NC
January 22, 2025; 7:00 pm, ESPN+		High Point	L 77–86	5–16 (1–5)	G. B. Hodge Center (651); Spartanburg, SC
January 25, 2025; 3:00 pm, ESPN+		at Longwood	L 54–80	5–17 (1–6)	Joan Perry Brock Center (2,637); Farmville, VA
January 29, 2025; 6:00 pm, ESPN+ / WYCW-TV		Charleston Southern	L 75–82	5–18 (1–7)	G. B. Hodge Center (818); Spartanburg, SC
February 1, 2025; 2:00 pm, ESPN+		at Radford	L 69–79	5–19 (1–8)	Dedmon Center; Radford, VA
February 5, 2025; 7:00 pm, ESPN+		at Presbyterian	L 64–75	5–20 (1–9)	Templeton Center (316); Clinton, SC
February 8, 2025; 2:00 pm, ESPN+		Winthrop	L 95–105	5–21 (1–10)	G. B. Hodge Center (368); Spartanburg, SC
February 12, 2025; 7:00 pm, ESPN+		UNC Asheville	L 85–92	5–22 (1–11)	G. B. Hodge Center (579); Spartanburg, SC
February 15, 2025; 3:00 pm, ESPN+		Gardner–Webb	L 87–96	5–23 (1–12)	G. B. Hodge Center (565); Spartanburg, SC
February 22, 2025; 2:00 pm, ESPN+		at Charleston Southern	W 79–69	6–23 (2–12)	Buccaneer Field House (823); North Charleston, SC
February 26, 2025; 7:00 pm, ESPN+		at High Point	L 66–88	6–24 (2–13)	Qubein Center (4,318); High Point, NC
March 1, 2025; 2:00 pm, ESPN+		Longwood	L 66–83	6–25 (2–14)	G. B. Hodge Center (471); Spartanburg, SC
Big South tournament
March 5, 2025; 7:30 p.m., ESPN+	(9)	vs. (8) Gardner–Webb; First round	L 63–83	6–26	Freedom Hall Civic Center; Johnson City, TN
*Non-conference game. ^{#}Rankings from AP Poll. (#) Tournament seedings in parentheses. All times are in Eastern.
