= 2024–25 UNC Asheville Bulldogs men's basketball team =

American college basketball season

2024–25 UNC Asheville Bulldogs men's basketball
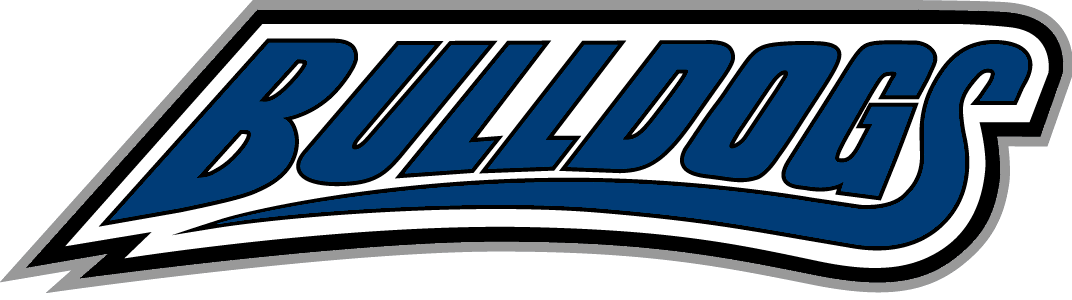
- Conference: Big South Conference
- Record: 21–11 (11–5 Big South)
- Head coach: Mike Morrell (7th season)
- Assistant coaches: Neil Dixon; Woody Taylor; Justin Levine
- Home arena: Kimmel Arena

2024–25 Big South men's basketball standings
	Conf.				Overall
Team	W		L	PCT	W		L	PCT
High Point †	14	–	2	.875	29	–	6	.829
UNC Asheville	11	–	5	.688	21	–	11	.656
Winthrop	11	–	5	.688	23	–	11	.676
Radford	9	–	7	.563	20	–	13	.606
Presbyterian	7	–	9	.438	14	–	19	.424
Longwood	7	–	9	.438	18	–	14	.563
Charleston Southern	6	–	10	.375	10	–	22	.313
Gardner–Webb	5	–	11	.313	11	–	20	.355
USC Upstate	2	–	14	.125	6	–	26	.188
† 2025 Big South tournament winner

The 2024–25 UNC Asheville Bulldogs men's basketball team represented the University of North Carolina at Asheville during the 2024–25 NCAA Division I men's basketball season. The Bulldogs, led by seventh-year head coach Mike Morrell, played their home games at Kimmel Arena in Asheville, North Carolina, as members of the Big South Conference.

== Previous season ==
The Bulldogs finished the 2023–24 season 22–12, 12–4 in Big South play to finish in second place. They defeated Charleston Southern, and Gardner–Webb, before falling to Longwood in the Big South tournament championship game.

== Roster ==
2024–25 UNC Asheville Bulldogs men's basketball team
Players
Coaches

Pos.	#	Name	Height	Weight	Year	Previous school	Hometown
F	0	Toyaz Solomon	6 ft 9 in (2.06 m)	185 lb (84 kg)	Sr	Caldwell CCTI	Enfield, North Carolina
G	2	Jordan Marsh	5 ft 10 in (1.78 m)	165 lb (75 kg)	So	Appalachian State	Charlotte, North Carolina
G	3	Josh Banks (5Y)	6 ft 5 in (1.96 m)	175 lb (79 kg)	Sr	VCU	Charlotte, North Carolina
F	4	Jemal Davis	6 ft 8 in (2.03 m)	205 lb (93 kg)	Sr	Central Michigan	Saint Thomas, U.S. Virgin Islands
G	5	Justin Wright (5Y)	6 ft 2 in (1.88 m)	185 lb (84 kg)	Sr	Loyola Marymount	Greenville, North Carolina
G/F	6	Kameron Taylor	6 ft 7 in (2.01 m)	185 lb (84 kg)	Fr	Carmel Christian School	Charlotte, North Carolina
G/F	7	Aidan Rubio	6 ft 6 in (1.98 m)	200 lb (91 kg)	Jr	Central Michigan	Flint, Michigan
PG	8	Julian Clarke	6 ft 1 in (1.85 m)	160 lb (73 kg)	Fr	Lake Highland Prep	Orlando, Florida
F	11	Greg Gantt Jr. (5Y)	6 ft 8 in (2.03 m)	210 lb (95 kg)	Sr	NC State	Fayetteville, North Carolina
G	12	Fletcher Abee (5Y)	6 ft 4 in (1.93 m)	190 lb (86 kg)	Sr	The Citadel	Morganton, North Carolina
G	14	Connor Dubsky	6 ft 4 in (1.93 m)	195 lb (88 kg)	So	Rhode Island	Woodbridge, Virginia
G	22	Javoy Thompson	6 ft 7 in (2.01 m)	197 lb (89 kg)	So	Redemption Christian Academy	Bronx, New York
G	23	Finn Black	6 ft 6 in (1.98 m)	—	Fr	St. Anne's-Belfield School	Charlottesville, Virginia
G	24	Corey Jones	6 ft 2 in (1.88 m)	175 lb (79 kg)	So	Woodstock Academy	Wake Forest, North Carolina
G	25	Rasheed Baldwin	6 ft 5 in (1.96 m)	190 lb (86 kg)	Jr	Chowan	Charlotte, North Carolina
F	44	Sage Tolentino	7 ft 1 in (2.16 m)	240 lb (109 kg)	RS So	Cincinnati	Kaneohe, Hawaii

Head coach

- Mike Morrell (Milligan)

Assistant coach(es)

- Neil Dixon (West Virginia)
- Woody Taylor (Eckerd)
- Justin Levine (Ithaca)

Legend

- (C) Team captain
- (S) Suspended
- (I) Ineligible
- (W) Walk-on
- (5Y) Fifth-year senior
- Injured
- Current redshirt

Roster
Last update: October 25, 2024

== Schedule and results ==
Date time, TV	Rank^{#}	Opponent^{#}	Result	Record	Site (attendance) city, state
Non-conference regular season
November 4, 2024*; 9:00 pm, ESPNU		at No. 2 Alabama	L 54–110	0–1	Coleman Coliseum (13,474); Tuscaloosa, AL
November 9, 2024*; 7:00 pm, ESPN+		at Ohio	L 76–82	0–2	Convocation Center (5,438); Athens, OH
November 18, 2024*; 7:00 pm, ESPN+		at North Florida	W 89–75	1–2	UNF Arena (1,994); Jacksonville, FL
November 22, 2024*; 8:30 pm, ESPN+		vs. Southeast Missouri State	W 72–64	2–2	Farris Center (125); Conway, AR
November 24, 2024*; 2:00 pm, ESPN+		at Central Arkansas	L 83–92 ^{2OT}	2–3	Farris Center (655); Conway, AR
December 1, 2024*; 2:00 pm, ESPN+		at Tennessee State	W 92–74	3–3	Gentry Center (125); Nashville, TN
December 3, 2024*; 7:00 pm, ESPN+		at George Mason	L 52–74	3–4	EagleBank Arena (2,340); Fairfax, VA
December 7, 2024*; 2:00 pm, ESPN+		St. Andrews	W 120–64	4–4	Kimmel Arena (778); Asheville, NC
December 11, 2024*; 4:30 pm, ESPN+		Bluefield	W 92–46	5–4	Kimmel Arena (660); Asheville, NC
December 14, 2024*; 2:00 pm, ESPN+		Western Carolina	W 78–61	6–4	Kimmel Arena (923); Asheville, NC
December 17, 2024*; 6:30 pm, ESPN+		North Florida	W 95–81	7–4	Kimmel Arena (679); Asheville, NC
December 19, 2024*; 6:30 pm, ESPN+		Virginia Lynchburg	W 114–60	8–4	Kimmel Arena (562); Asheville, NC
December 21, 2024*; 2:00 pm, FloHoops		at UNC Wilmington	L 74–85	8–5	Trask Coliseum (3,402); Wilmington, NC
December 30, 2024*; 6:30 pm, ESPN+		Columbia International	W 95–53	9–5	Kimmel Arena (685); Asheville, NC
Big South regular season
January 4, 2025; 2:00 pm, ESPN+		High Point	W 103–99	10–5 (1–0)	Kimmel Arena (1,739); Asheville, NC
January 8, 2025; 7:00 pm, ESPN+		at Longwood	L 76–85	10–6 (1–1)	Joan Perry Brock Center (1,487); Farmville, VA
January 11, 2025; 2:00 pm, ESPN+		at Presbyterian	W 96–87	11–6 (2–1)	Templeton Center (451); Clinton, SC
January 15, 2025; 6:30 pm, ESPN+		USC Upstate	W 93–92	12–6 (3–1)	Kimmel Arena (1,481); Asheville, NC
January 18, 2025; 2:00 pm, ESPN+		Winthrop	W 93–84	13–6 (4–1)	Kimmel Arena (1,812); Asheville, NC
January 22, 2025; 7:00 pm, ESPN+		at Gardner–Webb	W 61–53	14–6 (5–1)	Paul Porter Arena (1,725); Boiling Springs, NC
January 25, 2025; 3:30 pm, ESPN+		at Charleston Southern	W 69–61	15–6 (6–1)	Buccaneer Field House (875); North Charleston, SC
January 29, 2025; 6:30 pm, ESPN+		Radford	W 72–65	16–6 (7–1)	Kimmel Arena (973); Asheville, NC
February 6, 2025; 6:30 pm, ESPNU		Gardner–Webb	W 78–70	17–6 (8–1)	Kimmel Arena (1,123); Asheville, NC
February 8, 2025; 7:00 pm, ESPN+		at High Point	L 100–104 ^{OT}	17–7 (8–2)	Qubein Center (6,214); High Point, NC
February 12, 2025; 7:00 pm, ESPN+		at USC Upstate	W 92–85	18–7 (9–2)	G. B. Hodge Center (579); Spartanburg, SC
February 15, 2025; 4:30 pm, ESPN+		Charleston Southern	W 75–72	19–7 (10–2)	Kimmel Arena (2,312); Asheville, NC
February 20, 2025; 7:00 pm, ESPNU		at Radford	L 53-77	19–8 (10–3)	Dedmon Center (973); Radford, VA
February 22, 2025; 2:00 pm, ESPN+		Longwood	W 87–82	20–8 (11–3)	Kimmel Arena (2,093); Asheville, NC
February 26, 2025; 6:30 pm, ESPN+		Presbyterian	L 59–64	20–9 (11–4)	Kimmel Arena (1,169); Asheville, NC
March 1, 2025; 4:00 pm, ESPN+		at Winthrop	L 90–103	20–10 (11–5)	Winthrop Coliseum (3,085); Rock Hill, SC
Big South tournament
March 7, 2025; 6:00 pm, ESPN+	(2)	vs. (7) Charleston Southern; Quarterfinals	W 80–60	21–10	Freedom Hall Civic Center; Johnson City, TN
March 8, 2025; 2:30 pm, ESPN+	(2)	vs. (3) Winthrop; Semifinals	L 67–86	21–11	Freedom Hall Civic Center; Johnson City, TN
*Non-conference game. ^{#}Rankings from AP Poll. (#) Tournament seedings in parentheses. All times are in Eastern.
