= List of Creighton Bluejays men's basketball head coaches =

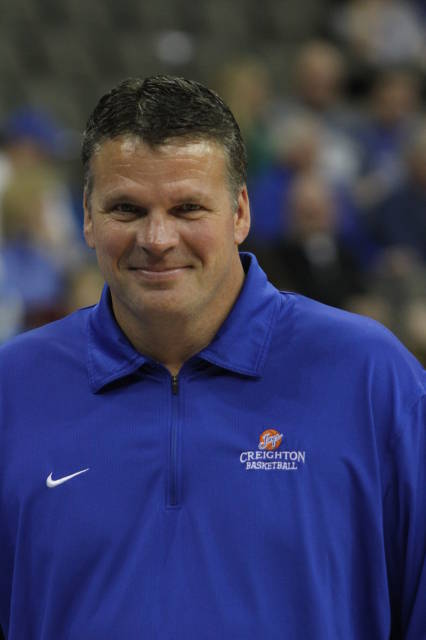
Greg McDermott, head coach from 2010–2026, is the all-time winningest coach of the Creighton Bluejays.

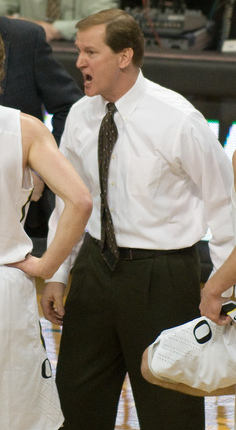
Dana Altman, the 2nd winningest head coach in Bluejays men's basketball history.

The following is a list of Creighton Bluejays men's basketball head coaches. There have been 17 head coaches of the Bluejays in their 111-season history.

Creighton's current head coach is Alan Huss. He was hired as the Bluejays' head coach on March 23 2026, replacing Greg McDermott, who announced his retirement the same day.

No.	Tenure	Coach	Years	Record	Pct.
1	1916–1920	Thomas E. Millis	4	53–6	.898
2	1920–1921 (Note: Mulholland resigned on February 5, 1921. Kearney replaced him on a permanent basis for the rest of the 1920–21 season.)	Eddie Mulholland	1	5–1	.833
3	1921–1922	Charles Kearney	2	33–10	.767
4	1922–1935	Arthur A. Schabinger	13	165–66	.714
5	1935–1943; 1946–1947	Eddie Hickey	9	126–71	.640
6	1945–1946; 1947–1952	Duce Belford	6	56–83	.403
7	1952–1955	Subby Salerno	3	30–45	.400
8	1955–1959	Tommy Thomsen	5	49–39	.557
9	1959–1969	Red McManus	10	138–118	.539
10	1969–1974	Eddie Sutton	5	82–50	.621
11	1974–1981	Tom Apke	7	130–64	.670
12	1981–1985	Willis Reed	4	52–65	.444
13	1985–1991	Tony Barone	6	102–82	.554
14	1991–1994	Rick Johnson	3	24–59	.289
15	1994–2010	Dana Altman	16	327–176	.650
16	2010–2026	Greg McDermott	16	366–189	.659
17	2026–present	Alan Huss	1	0–0	–
Totals		17 coaches	111 seasons	1,738–1,024	.629
Records updated through end of 2025–26 season Source
