= 2024–25 Radford Highlanders men's basketball team =

American college basketball season

2024–25 Radford Highlanders men's basketball
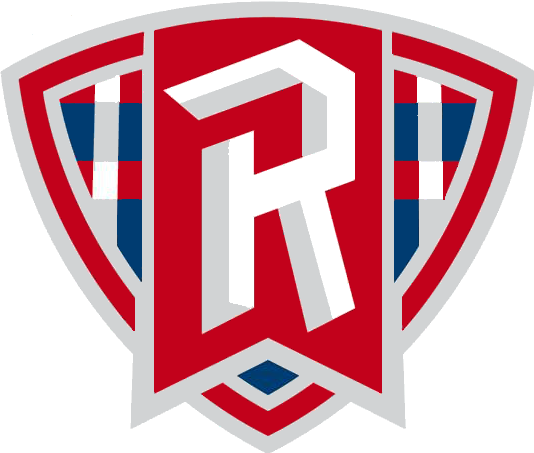

Sunshine Slam Ocean Bracket champions
- Conference: Big South Conference
- Record: 20–13 (9–7 Big South)
- Head coach: Darris Nichols (4th season)
- Assistant coaches: Shane Nichols; Timothy Peete; James Haring
- Home arena: Dedmon Center

2024–25 Big South men's basketball standings
	Conf.				Overall
Team	W		L	PCT	W		L	PCT
High Point †	14	–	2	.875	29	–	6	.829
UNC Asheville	11	–	5	.688	21	–	11	.656
Winthrop	11	–	5	.688	23	–	11	.676
Radford	9	–	7	.563	20	–	13	.606
Presbyterian	7	–	9	.438	14	–	19	.424
Longwood	7	–	9	.438	18	–	14	.563
Charleston Southern	6	–	10	.375	10	–	22	.313
Gardner–Webb	5	–	11	.313	11	–	20	.355
USC Upstate	2	–	14	.125	6	–	26	.188
† 2025 Big South tournament winner

The 2024–25 Radford Highlanders men's basketball team represented Radford University during the 2024–25 NCAA Division I men's basketball season. The Highlanders, led by fourth-year head coach Darris Nichols, played their home games at the Dedmon Center in Radford, Virginia as members of the Big South Conference.

The Highlanders finished the season 20–13, 9–7 in Big South play, to finish in fourth place. They defeated Presbyterian in the quarterfinals of the Big South tournament before losing to High Point in the semifinals.

== Previous season ==
The Highlanders finished the 2023–24 season 16–17, 5–11 in Big South play, to finish in a tie for eighth place. They defeated USC Upstate before falling to top-seeded High Point in the quarterfinals of the Big South tournament.

== Roster ==
2024–25 Radford Highlanders men's basketball team
Players
Coaches

Pos.	#	Name	Height	Weight	Year	Previous school	Hometown
G	0	Brandon Maclin	6 ft 5 in (1.96 m)	215 lb (98 kg)	Jr	Odessa College	Jackson, TN
G	1	Zion Walker	6 ft 2 in (1.88 m)	205 lb (93 kg)	Fr	The Burlington School	Burlington, NC
G	2	Chace Davis	6 ft 3 in (1.91 m)	180 lb (82 kg)	Sr	Maryland Eastern Shore	Fort Washington, MD
G	3	Brennan Chatman	6 ft 2 in (1.88 m)	195 lb (88 kg)	Fr	Norfolk Collegiate School	Norfolk, VA
G	4	Truth Harris	6 ft 2 in (1.88 m)	180 lb (82 kg)	RS Sr	Indian Hills Community College	Mount Vernon, NY
F	5	Josiah Harris	6 ft 9 in (2.06 m)	225 lb (102 kg)	Sr	St. Francis Brooklyn	Wilmington, DE
F	6	Isaiah Gaines	6 ft 8 in (2.03 m)	225 lb (102 kg)	Sr	Florida Atlantic	Pensacola, FL
F	7	Jonas Sirtautas	6 ft 10 in (2.08 m)	195 lb (88 kg)	So	Wyoming	Kaunas, Lithuania
G	10	Tony Felder	5 ft 10 in (1.78 m)	175 lb (79 kg)	Jr	Stonehill	Brockton, MA
G	11	Jarvis Moss	6 ft 4 in (1.93 m)	200 lb (91 kg)	Sr	Davidson	Concord, NC
G	12	Brock Rose	6 ft 6 in (1.98 m)	190 lb (86 kg)	Fr	Ardrey Kell High School	Charlotte, NC
F	23	TJ NeSmith	6 ft 10 in (2.08 m)	245 lb (111 kg)	RS Sr	Lenoir–Rhyne	Burlington, NC
G	32	David Early	6 ft 4 in (1.93 m)	235 lb (107 kg)	Sr	Tennessee Tech	Holden, WV
F	34	Xavier Foster	7 ft 0 in (2.13 m)	225 lb (102 kg)	Sr	SMU	Oskaloosa, IA
F	54	Ibu Yamazaki	6 ft 7 in (2.01 m)	215 lb (98 kg)	RS So	Meisei High School	Matsudo, Japan

Head coach

- Darris Nichols (West Virginia)

Assistant coach(es)

- Shane Nichols (Wofford)
- Timothy Peete (Tulsa)
- James Haring (West Virginia)

Legend

- (C) Team captain
- (S) Suspended
- (I) Ineligible
- (W) Walk-on
- Injured
- Current redshirt

Roster
Last update: October 25, 2024

== Schedule and results ==
Date time, TV	Rank^{#}	Opponent^{#}	Result	Record	Site (attendance) city, state
Exhibition
October 24, 2024*; 7:00 p.m.		Bridgewater	W 85–46	–	Dedmon Center; Radford, VA
Non-conference regular season
November 4, 2024*; 7:00 p.m., ACCNX		at Pittsburgh	L 56–96	0–1	Petersen Events Center (6,579); Pittsburgh, PA
November 8, 2024*; 7:00 p.m., ESPN+		William & Mary	W 89–77	1–1	Dedmon Center (1,211); Radford, VA
November 12, 2024*; 7:00 p.m., ESPN+		Old Dominion	W 87–75	2–1	Dedmon Center (1,731); Radford, VA
November 16, 2024*; 2:00 p.m., ESPN+		at Evansville	W 92–81	3–1	Ford Center (4,308); Evansville, IN
November 18, 2024*; 7:00 p.m., ESPN+		Southern Virginia	W 96–50	4–1	Dedmon Center (1,236); Radford, VA
November 21, 2024*; 7:00 p.m., ACCNX		at Clemson; Sunshine Slam campus game	L 51–79	4–2	Littlejohn Coliseum (7,166); Clemson, SC
November 25, 2024*; 10:30 a.m.		vs. Chicago State; Sunshine Slam Ocean Bracket semifinals	W 63–48	5–2	Ocean Center; Daytona Beach, FL
November 26, 2024*; 6:30 p.m., BallerTV		vs. Purdue Fort Wayne; Sunshine Slam Ocean Bracket championship	W 69–56	6–2	Ocean Center (1,548); Daytona Beach, FL
December 1, 2024*; 2:00 p.m., NEC Front Row		at Saint Francis	W 79–70	7–2	DeGol Arena (672); Loretto, PA
December 5, 2024*; 7:00 p.m., ESPN+		at North Carolina Central	W 70–67	8–2	McDougald–McLendon Arena (225); Durham, NC
December 8, 2024*; 2:00 p.m., ESPN+		Bucknell	W 74–70 ^{OT}	9–2	Dedmon Center (1,118); Radford, VA
December 14, 2024*; 7:00 p.m., ESPN+		at Utah	L 63–81	9–3	Jon M. Huntsman Center (7,370); Salt Lake City, UT
December 17, 2024*; 9:00 p.m., MW Network		at Colorado State	L 68–78	9–4	Moby Arena (3,931); Fort Collins, CO
December 20, 2024*; 1:00 p.m., ESPN+		Virginia Lynchburg	W 122–63	10–4	Dedmon Center (831); Radford, VA
December 22, 2024*; 2:00 p.m., SECN+		at South Carolina	L 48–74	10–5	Colonial Life Arena (10,831); Columbia, SC
Big South regular season
January 2, 2025; 7:00 p.m., ESPNU		at High Point	L 58–76	10–6 (0–1)	Qubein Center (4,647); High Point, NC
January 4, 2025; 4:30 p.m., ESPN+		Winthrop	W 87–67	11–6 (1–1)	Dedmon Center (916); Radford, VA
January 11, 2025; 2:00 p.m., ESPN+		at USC Upstate	W 80–67	12–6 (2–1)	G. B. Hodge Center (372); Spartanburg, SC
January 15, 2025; 7:00 p.m., ESPN+		Gardner–Webb	W 79–75	13–6 (3–1)	Dedmon Center (1,324); Radford, VA
January 18, 2025; 2:00 p.m., ESPN+		at Charleston Southern	L 54–58	13–7 (3–2)	Buccaneer Field House (785); North Charleston, SC
January 22, 2025; 7:00 p.m., ESPN+		Longwood	L 74–77	13–8 (3–3)	Dedmon Center (1,411); Radford, VA
January 25, 2025; 4:30 p.m., ESPN+		at Presbyterian	W 82–69	14–8 (4–3)	Templeton Center (429); Clinton, SC
January 29, 2025; 6:30 p.m., ESPN+		at UNC Asheville	L 65–72	14–9 (4–4)	Kimmel Arena (973); Asheville, NC
February 1, 2025; 2:00 p.m., ESPN+		USC Upstate	W 79–69	15–9 (5–4)	Dedmon Center; Radford, VA
February 5, 2025; 7:00 p.m., ESPN+		High Point	L 75–78	15–10 (5–5)	Dedmon Center (1,342); Radford, VA
February 8, 2025; 3:00 p.m., ESPN+		at Longwood	W 71–69	16–10 (6–5)	Joan Perry Brock Center (3,072); Farmville, VA
February 12, 2025; 6:30 p.m., ESPN+		at Winthrop	L 74–78	16–11 (6–6)	Winthrop Coliseum (1,909); Rock Hill, SC
February 20, 2025; 7:00 p.m., ESPNU		UNC Asheville	W 77–53	17–11 (7–6)	Dedmon Center (1,924); Radford, VA
February 22, 2025; 4:30 p.m., ESPN+		Presbyterian	L 73–80	17–12 (7–7)	Dedmon Center (1,378); Radford, VA
February 26, 2025; 7:00 p.m., ESPN+		at Gardner–Webb	W 63–56	18–12 (8–7)	Paul Porter Arena (1,155); Boiling Springs, NC
March 1, 2025; 2:00 p.m., ESPN+		Charleston Southern	W 76–60	19–12 (9–7)	Dedmon Center (1,423); Radford, VA
Big South tournament
March 7, 2025; 2:30 p.m., ESPN+	(4)	vs. (5) Presbyterian; Quarterfinals	W 74–69 ^{OT}	20–12	Freedom Hall Civic Center (1,541); Johnson City, TN
March 8, 2025; 12:00 p.m., ESPN+	(4)	vs. (1) High Point; Semifinals	L 73–76	20–13	Freedom Hall Civic Center (1); Johnson City, TN
*Non-conference game. ^{#}Rankings from AP poll. (#) Tournament seedings in parentheses. All times are in Eastern.
