= 2024–25 High Point Panthers men's basketball team =

American college basketball season

2024–25 High Point Panthers men's basketball

Big South regular season & tournament champions

NCAA tournament, First round
- Conference: Big South Conference
- Record: 29–6 (14–2 Big South)
- Head coach: Alan Huss (2nd season)
- Associate head coach: Flynn Clayman
- Assistant coaches: Mike Nesbitt; Corey Edwards; Matt Brady; Antoine Young
- Home arena: Qubein Center

2024–25 Big South men's basketball standings
	Conf.				Overall
Team	W		L	PCT	W		L	PCT
High Point †	14	–	2	.875	29	–	6	.829
UNC Asheville	11	–	5	.688	21	–	11	.656
Winthrop	11	–	5	.688	23	–	11	.676
Radford	9	–	7	.563	20	–	13	.606
Presbyterian	7	–	9	.438	14	–	19	.424
Longwood	7	–	9	.438	18	–	14	.563
Charleston Southern	6	–	10	.375	10	–	22	.313
Gardner–Webb	5	–	11	.313	11	–	20	.355
USC Upstate	2	–	14	.125	6	–	26	.188
† 2025 Big South tournament winner

The 2024–25 High Point Panthers men's basketball team represented High Point University during the 2024–25 NCAA Division I men's basketball season. The Panthers, led by second-year head coach Alan Huss, play their home games at the Qubein Center in High Point, North Carolina as members of the Big South Conference. As the No. 1 seed in the Big South tournament, the Panthers defeated Gardner–Webb, Radford, and Winthrop to win the tournament championship, overcoming a 15-point deficit in the final game. As a result, they received the conference's automatic bid to the NCAA tournament, the school's first-ever trip to the tournament at the Division 1 level. As a No. 13 seed in the Midwest regional of the tournament, they were defeated by No. 4-seeded Purdue in the first round.

== Previous season ==
The Panthers finished the 2023–24 season 27–9, 13–3 in Big South play to finish as Big South regular season champions. As the top seed in the Big South tournament, they defeated Radford in the quarterfinals, before being upset by eventual tournament champions Longwood in the semifinals. They received an invitation to the CBI, receiving the #1 seed, where they defeated Cleveland State and Arkansas State, before falling to Seattle in the championship game.

== Roster ==
2024–25 High Point Panthers men's basketball team
Players
Coaches

Pos.	#	Name	Height	Weight	Year	Hometown
F	0	Terry Anderson	6 ft 6 in (1.98 m)	202 lb (92 kg)	Sr	Deer Park, Texas
G	1	Kezza Giffa	6 ft 2 in (1.88 m)	175 lb (79 kg)	Sr	Paris, France
G	2	Chase Johnston	6 ft 3 in (1.91 m)	180 lb (82 kg)	GS	Boca Raton, Florida
G	3	Trae Benham	6 ft 4 in (1.93 m)	203 lb (92 kg)	Sr	Concord, North Carolina
G	4	D'Maurian Williams	6 ft 3 in (1.91 m)	209 lb (95 kg)	GS	Phoenix, Arizona
F	5	Kimani Hamilton	6 ft 8 in (2.03 m)	225 lb (102 kg)	Jr	Jackson, Mississippi
G	7	Titas Sargiunas	6 ft 4 in (1.93 m)	188 lb (85 kg)	So	Kaunas, Lithuania
F	10	Simon Hildebrandt	6 ft 9 in (2.06 m)	238 lb (108 kg)	Jr	Winnipeg, Canada
G	11	Abdoulaye Thiam	6 ft 4 in (1.93 m)	191 lb (87 kg)	Jr	Orlando, Florida
F	13	Liam McChesney	6 ft 10 in (2.08 m)	202 lb (92 kg)	GS	Prince Rupert, Canada
F	14	Birgir Irving	6 ft 7 in (2.01 m)	215 lb (98 kg)	Fr	Garðabær, Iceland
F	15	Braden Hausen	6 ft 7 in (2.01 m)	213 lb (97 kg)	Fr	Amarillo, Texas
G	16	Liam Carney	6 ft 6 in (1.98 m)	198 lb (90 kg)	So	Minneapolis, Minnesota
F	19	Josh Ibukunoluwa	6 ft 10 in (2.08 m)	219 lb (99 kg)	Fr	Perth, Australia
F	21	Juslin Bodo Bodo	7 ft 0 in (2.13 m)	255 lb (116 kg)	So	Yaoundé, Cameroon
G	22	Andrew Sineway	6 ft 6 in (1.98 m)	193 lb (88 kg)	So	Boynton Beach, Florida
G	24	David Fonville	6 ft 3 in (1.91 m)	198 lb (90 kg)	Fr	Jacksonville, Florida
G	33	Mavrick Miller	6 ft 4 in (1.93 m)	180 lb (82 kg)	Fr	Memphis, Tennessee
F	40	Ivan Matlekovic	7 ft 0 in (2.13 m)	245 lb (111 kg)	Fr	Sisak, Croatia
G	55	Bobby Pettiford	6 ft 0 in (1.83 m)	195 lb (88 kg)	Sr	Durham, North Carolina

Head coach

- Alan Huss (Creighton)

Assistant coach(es)

- Flynn Clayman (Troy)
- Mike Nesbitt (New Mexico)
- Corey Edwards (George Mason)
- Matt Brady (Siena)
- Antoine Young (Creighton)

Legend

- (C) Team captain
- (S) Suspended
- (I) Ineligible
- (W) Walk-on
- Injured
- Current redshirt

Roster
Last update: October 22, 2024

== Schedule and results ==
Date time, TV	Rank^{#}	Opponent^{#}	Result	Record	Site (attendance) city, state
Exhibition
October 27, 2024*; 4:00 pm		at East Tennessee State	W 71–56	—	Freedom Hall Civic Center; Johnson City, TN
November 2, 2024*; 7:00 pm		Averett	W 85–57	—	Qubein Center (5,144); High Point, NC
Non-conference regular season
November 6, 2024*; 7:00 pm, ESPN+		Coppin State	W 93–51	1–0	Qubein Center (3,017); High Point, NC
November 9, 2024*; 2:00 pm, ESPN+		Jackson State	W 80–71	2–0	Qubein Center (3,006); High Point, NC
November 12, 2024*; 7:00 pm, ESPN+		North Carolina Central	W 76–60	3–0	Qubein Center (2,896); High Point, NC
November 15, 2024*; 7:00 pm, ESPN+		UAB	W 68–65	4–0	Qubein Center (5,028); High Point, NC
November 18, 2024*; 7:00 pm, ESPN+		American	W 80–73	5–0	Qubein Center (2,889); High Point, NC
November 24, 2024*; 5:00 pm, FloHoops		vs. Missouri State; Cayman Islands Classic quarterfinals	L 61–71	5–1	John Gray Gymnasium; George Town, Cayman Islands
November 25, 2024*; 5:00 pm, FloHoops		vs. Old Dominion; Cayman Islands Classic consolation round	W 73–67	6–1	John Gray Gymnasium (915); George Town, Cayman Islands
November 26, 2024*; 1:30 pm, FloHoops		vs. Hampton; Cayman Islands Classic 5th place game	W 76–73	7–1	John Gray Gymnasium (925); George Town, Cayman Islands
November 30, 2024*; 2:00 pm, ESPN+		Pfeiffer	W 81–50	8–1	Qubein Center (1,846); High Point, NC
December 3, 2024*; 7:00 pm, ESPN+		at UNC Greensboro	L 68–72	8–2	Fleming Gymnasium (1,680); Greensboro, NC
December 6, 2024*; 8:00 pm, ESPN+		North Texas	W 76–71	9–2	Qubein Center (3,978); High Point, NC
December 14, 2024*; 2:00 pm, ESPN+		vs. Appalachian State	W 65–59	10–2	Novant Health Fieldhouse (1,245); Greensboro, NC
December 17, 2024*; 7:00 pm, ESPN+		Carolina	W 99–31	11–2	Qubein Center (1,778); High Point, NC
December 21, 2024*; 2:00 pm, ESPN+		at Southern Illinois	W 94–81	12–2	Banterra Center (4,344); Carbondale, IL
December 29, 2024*; 2:00 pm, ESPN+		Norfolk State	L 74–77	12–3	Qubein Center (2,743); High Point, NC
Big South regular season
January 2, 2025; 7:00 pm, ESPNU		Radford	W 76–58	13–3 (1–0)	Qubein Center (4,647); High Point, NC
January 4, 2025; 2:00 pm, ESPN+		at UNC Asheville	L 99–103	13–4 (1–1)	Kimmel Arena (1,739); Asheville, NC
January 8, 2025; 7:00 pm, ESPN+		at Charleston Southern	W 93–79	14–4 (2–1)	Buccaneer Field House (456); North Charleston, SC
January 11, 2025; 7:00 pm, ESPN+		Gardner–Webb	W 96–55	15–4 (3–1)	Qubein Center (2,714); High Point, NC
January 16, 2025; 7:00 pm, ESPNU		at Longwood	L 80–82	15–5 (3–2)	Joan Perry Brock Center (3,128); Farmville, VA
January 18, 2025; 7:00 pm, ESPN+		Presbyterian	W 77–66	16–5 (4–2)	Qubein Center (4,188); High Point, NC
January 22, 2025; 7:00 pm, ESPN+		at USC Upstate	W 86–77	17–5 (5–2)	G. B. Hodge Center (651); Spartanburg, SC
January 25, 2025; 2:00 pm, ESPN+		Winthrop	W 84–62	18–5 (6–2)	Qubein Center (4,623); High Point, NC
February 1, 2025; 2:00 pm, ESPN+		at Presbyterian	W 84–72	19–5 (7–2)	Templeton Center (735); Clinton, SC
February 5, 2025; 7:00 pm, ESPN+		at Radford	W 78–75	20–5 (8–2)	Dedmon Center (1,342); Radford, VA
February 8, 2025; 7:00 pm, ESPN+		UNC Asheville	W 104–100 ^{OT}	21–5 (9–2)	Qubein Center (6,214); High Point, NC
February 13, 2025; 7:00 pm, ESPNU		Longwood	W 83–72	22–5 (10–2)	Qubein Center (5,988); High Point, NC
February 15, 2025; 2:00 pm, ESPN+		at Winthrop	W 88–66	23–5 (11–2)	Winthrop Coliseum (2,736); Rock Hill, SC
February 19, 2025; 7:00 pm, ESPN+		Charleston Southern	W 83–60	24–5 (12–2)	Qubein Center (2,793); High Point, NC
February 22, 2025; 2:00 pm, ESPN+		at Gardner–Webb	W 90–67	25–5 (13–2)	Paul Porter Arena (2,876); Boiling Springs, NC
February 26, 2025; 7:00 pm, ESPN+		USC Upstate	W 88–66	26–5 (14–2)	Qubein Center (4,318); High Point, NC
Big South tournament
March 7, 2025; 12:00 pm, ESPN+	(1)	vs. (8) Gardner–Webb; Quarterfinals	W 85–64	27–5	Freedom Hall Civic Center (1,541); Johnson City, TN
March 8, 2025; 12:00 pm, ESPN+	(1)	vs. (4) Radford; Semifinals	W 76–73	28–5	Freedom Hall Civic Center; Johnson City, TN
March 9, 2025; 12:00 pm, ESPN2	(1)	vs. (3) Winthrop; Championship	W 81–69	29–5	Freedom Hall Civic Center (2,097); Johnson City, TN
NCAA tournament
March 20, 2025*; 12:40 pm, TruTV	(13 MW)	vs. (4 MW) No. 22 Purdue; First Round	L 63–75	29–6	Amica Mutual Pavilion (11,441); Providence, RI
*Non-conference game. ^{#}Rankings from AP Poll. (#) Tournament seedings in parentheses. MW=Midwest. All times are in Eastern.
