= 2024–25 Presbyterian Blue Hose men's basketball team =

American college basketball season

2024–25 Presbyterian Blue Hose men's basketball
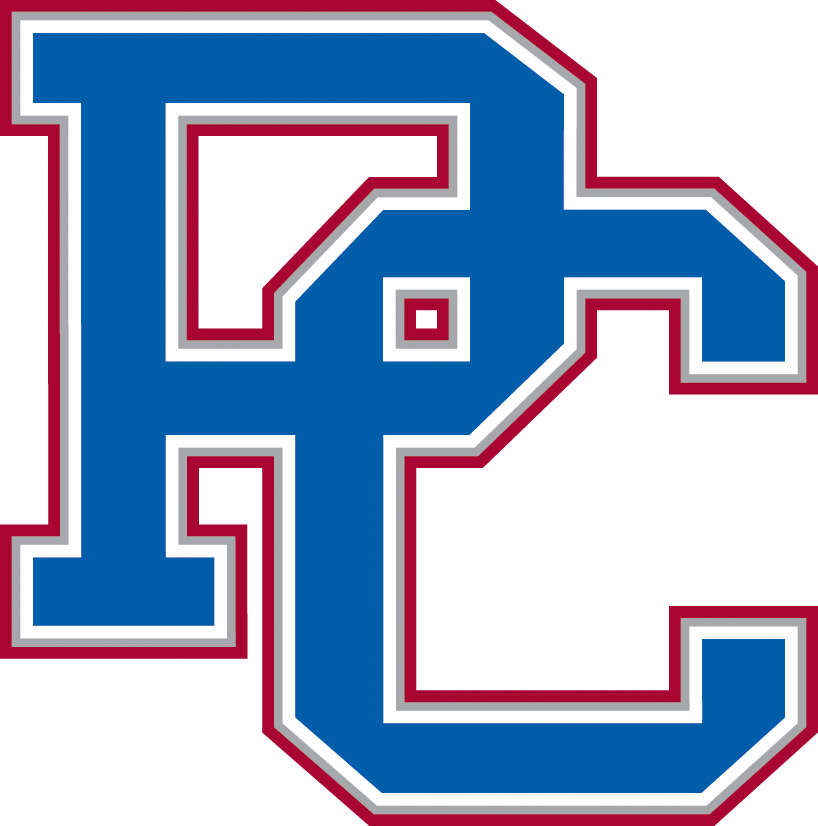

Axe 'Em Classic Champions

CBI, First Round
- Conference: Big South Conference
- Record: 14–19 (7–9 Big South)
- Head coach: Quinton Ferrell (6th season)
- Assistant coaches: Al'lonzo Coleman; Justin Griffith; Rob Lane
- Home arena: Templeton Center

2024–25 Big South men's basketball standings
	Conf.				Overall
Team	W		L	PCT	W		L	PCT
High Point †	14	–	2	.875	29	–	6	.829
UNC Asheville	11	–	5	.688	21	–	11	.656
Winthrop	11	–	5	.688	23	–	11	.676
Radford	9	–	7	.563	20	–	13	.606
Presbyterian	7	–	9	.438	14	–	19	.424
Longwood	7	–	9	.438	18	–	14	.563
Charleston Southern	6	–	10	.375	10	–	22	.313
Gardner–Webb	5	–	11	.313	11	–	20	.355
USC Upstate	2	–	14	.125	6	–	26	.188
† 2025 Big South tournament winner

The 2024–25 Presbyterian Blue Hose men's basketball team represented Presbyterian College during the 2024–25 NCAA Division I men's basketball season. The Blue Hose, led by sixth-year head coach Quinton Ferrell, played their home games at the Templeton Center in Clinton, South Carolina as members of the Big South Conference.

== Previous season ==
The Blue Hose finished the 2023–24 season 14–19, 6–10 in Big South play to finish in a three-way tie for fifth place. They were defeated by Gardner–Webb in the quarterfinals of the Big South tournament. They received an invitation to the CBI, being given the #12 seed, where they would be defeated by Montana in the first round.

== Roster ==
2024–25 Presbyterian Blue Hose men's basketball team
Players
Coaches

Pos.	#	Name	Height	Weight	Year	Previous school	Hometown
G	0	Iverson King	6 ft 6 in (1.98 m)	205 lb (93 kg)	Fr	Forsyth Country Day School	Lewisville, NC
G	1	Luke Allison	6 ft 0 in (1.83 m)	170 lb (77 kg)	Fr	Sentinel High School	Missoula, MT
G	2	Khalon Hudson	6 ft 6 in (1.98 m)	215 lb (98 kg)	So	Spartanburg Methodist College	Augusta, GA
G/F	3	Kobe Stewart (5Y)	6 ft 7 in (2.01 m)	200 lb (91 kg)	Sr	Cross Creek High School	Augusta, GA
G	4	Kory Mincy	6 ft 2 in (1.88 m)	180 lb (82 kg)	So	Tri-Cities High School	East Point, GA
G	5	Houston Jones	6 ft 5 in (1.96 m)	195 lb (88 kg)	RS So	Dutch Fork High School	Lexington, SC
F	6	Chidi Chiakwelu	6 ft 8 in (2.03 m)	205 lb (93 kg)	Fr	George Ranch High School	Houston, TX
G	7	Triston Wilson	6 ft 6 in (1.98 m)	205 lb (93 kg)	Fr	Miami Norland Senior High School	Miami, FL
G	10	Jamahri Harvey	6 ft 5 in (1.96 m)	175 lb (79 kg)	Sr	UNC Wilmington	Fayetteville, NC
G	11	Quadir Pettaway	6 ft 2 in (1.88 m)	180 lb (82 kg)	Jr	Central Pointe Christian Academy	Newport News, VA
G	12	Carl Parrish	6 ft 3 in (1.91 m)	170 lb (77 kg)	So	Miami Norland Senior High School	Miami Gardens, FL
F	14	Jaylen Peterson	6 ft 8 in (2.03 m)	200 lb (91 kg)	RS So	Greenforest-McCalep Christian Academy	Stone Mountain, GA
F	15	Jonah Pierce	6 ft 10 in (2.08 m)	235 lb (107 kg)	Sr	Francis Marion	Sanford, FL
F	30	Kaleb Scott	6 ft 8 in (2.03 m)	250 lb (113 kg)	Sr	Georgia State	Raleigh, NC

Head coach

- Quinton Ferrell (Presbyterian)

Assistant coach(es)

- Al'lonzo Coleman (Presbyterian)
- Justin Griffith (NC Wesleyan)
- Rob Lane (Pittsburgh)

Legend

- (C) Team captain
- (S) Suspended
- (I) Ineligible
- (W) Walk-on
- (5Y) Fifth-year senior
- Injured
- Current redshirt

Roster
Last update: October 24, 2024

== Schedule and results ==
Date time, TV	Rank^{#}	Opponent^{#}	Result	Record	Site (attendance) city, state
Non-conference regular season
November 4, 2024*; 8:00 pm, ESPN+		at Charlotte	L 79–88	0–1	Dale F. Halton Arena (3,343); Charlotte, NC
November 6, 2024*; 7:00 pm, ESPN+		Carolina Christian	W 120–45	1–1	Templeton Center (354); Clinton, SC
November 8, 2024*; 7:00 pm, ACCNX/ESPN+		at NC State	L 72–81	1–2	Lenovo Center (12,949); Raleigh, NC
November 13, 2024*; 7:00 pm, ESPN+		Wofford	W 71–68	2–2	Templeton Center (552); Clinton, SC
November 16, 2024*; 11:00 am, ESPN+		at Kennesaw State	L 67–85	2–3	Convocation Center (1,136); Kennesaw, GA
November 21, 2024*; 7:30 pm, ESPN+		at Stephen F. Austin; The Axe 'Em Classic	W 58–55 ^{OT}	3–3	William R. Johnson Coliseum (1,469); Nacogdoches, TX
November 22, 2024*; 3:30 pm		vs. Youngstown State; The Axe 'Em Classic	W 67–42	4–3	William R. Johnson Coliseum (103); Nacogdoches, TX
November 23, 2024*; 12:00 pm		vs. Monmouth; The Axe 'Em Classic	W 71–61	5–3	William R. Johnson Coliseum (103); Nacogdoches, TX
November 27, 2024*; 2:00 pm, ESPN+		at Tennessee Tech	L 75–90	5–4	Hooper Eblen Center (642); Cookeville, TN
December 3, 2024*; 7:00 pm		at Florida A&M	L 63–66	5–5	Al Lawson Center (1,088); Tallahassee, FL
December 11, 2024*; 12:00 pm, ESPN+		Columbia (SC)	W 97–57	6–5	Templeton Center (583); Clinton, SC
December 15, 2024*; 2:00 pm, ACCNX/ESPN+		at Miami (FL)	L 75–94	6–6	Watsco Center (5,214); Coral Gables, FL
December 18, 2024*; 2:00 pm, ESPN+		Virginia Lynchburg	W 116–53	7–6	Templeton Center (270); Clinton, SC
December 21, 2024*; 1:00 pm, ESPN+		Manhattan	L 81–86 ^{OT}	7–7	Templeton Center (290); Clinton, SC
December 30, 2024*; 7:00 pm, SECN		at South Carolina	L 59–69	7–8	Colonial Life Arena (10,525); Columbia, SC
Big South regular season
January 2, 2025; 2:00 pm, ESPN+		Longwood	W 68–60	8–8 (1–0)	Templeton Center (343); Clinton, SC
January 4, 2025; 2:00 pm, ESPN+		at Gardner–Webb	L 61–63	8–9 (1–1)	Paul Porter Arena (570); Boiling Springs, NC
January 8, 2025; 7:00 pm, ESPN+		at USC Upstate	L 67–77	8–10 (1–2)	G. B. Hodge Center (270); Spartanburg, SC
January 11, 2025; 2:00 pm, ESPN+		UNC Asheville	L 87–96	8–11 (1–3)	Templeton Center (451); Clinton, SC
January 18, 2025; 7:00 pm, ESPN+		at High Point	L 66–77	8–12 (1–4)	Qubein Center (4,188); High Point, NC
January 22, 2025; 7:00 pm, ESPN+		Charleston Southern	W 71–61	9–12 (2–4)	Templeton Center (421); Clinton, SC
January 25, 2025; 4:30 pm, ESPN+		Radford	L 69–82	9–13 (2–5)	Templeton Center (429); Clinton, SC
January 29, 2025; 6:30 pm, ESPN+		at Winthrop	L 67–76	9–14 (2–6)	Winthrop Coliseum (1,884); Rock Hill, SC
February 1, 2025; 2:00 pm, ESPN+		High Point	L 72–84	9–15 (2–7)	Templeton Center (735); Clinton, SC
February 5, 2025; 7:00 pm, ESPN+		USC Upstate	W 75–64	10–15 (3–7)	Templeton Center (316); Clinton, SC
February 12, 2025; 7:00 pm, ESPN+		at Charleston Southern	L 70–71	10–16 (3–8)	Buccaneer Field House (768); North Charleston, SC
February 15, 2025; 3:00 pm, ESPN+		at Longwood	W 77–68	11–16 (4–8)	Joan Perry Brock Center (2,231); Farmville, VA
February 19, 2025; 7:00 pm, ESPN+		Winthrop	L 77–81	11–17 (4–9)	Templeton Center (370); Clinton, SC
February 22, 2025; 4:30 pm, ESPN+		at Radford	W 80–73	12–17 (5–9)	Dedmon Center (1,378); Radford, VA
February 26, 2025; 6:30 pm, ESPN+		at UNC Asheville	W 64–59	13–17 (6–9)	Kimmel Arena (1,169); Asheville, NC
March 1, 2025; 2:00 pm, ESPN+		Gardner–Webb	W 68–57	14–17 (7–9)	Templeton Center (382); Clinton, SC
Big South tournament
March 7, 2025; 2:30 pm, ESPN+	(5)	vs. (4) Radford; Quarterfinals	L 69–74 ^{OT}	14–18	Freedom Hall Civic Center (1,541); Johnson City, TN
CBI
March 23, 2025; 6:30 p.m., FloSports		vs. Illinois State; First round	L 70–78	14–19	Ocean Center (832); Daytona Beach, FL
*Non-conference game. ^{#}Rankings from AP Poll. (#) Tournament seedings in parentheses. All times are in Eastern.
