= 2025 Big South Conference men's basketball tournament =

American collegiate sporting event

- Classification: Division I
- Season: 2024–25
- Teams: 9
- Site: Freedom Hall Civic Center; Johnson City, Tennessee
- Champions: High Point (1st title)
- Winning coach: Alan Huss (1st title)
- Television: ESPN+, ESPN2

2024–25 Big South men's basketball standings
	Conf.				Overall
Team	W		L	PCT	W		L	PCT
High Point †	14	–	2	.875	29	–	6	.829
UNC Asheville	11	–	5	.688	21	–	11	.656
Winthrop	11	–	5	.688	23	–	11	.676
Radford	9	–	7	.563	20	–	13	.606
Presbyterian	7	–	9	.438	14	–	19	.424
Longwood	7	–	9	.438	18	–	14	.563
Charleston Southern	6	–	10	.375	10	–	22	.313
Gardner–Webb	5	–	11	.313	11	–	20	.355
USC Upstate	2	–	14	.125	6	–	26	.188
† 2025 Big South tournament winner

The 2025 Big South men's basketball tournament was the postseason men's basketball tournament that ended the 2024–25 NCAA Division I men's basketball season of the Big South Conference. It was held from March 5–9 and played at the Freedom Hall Civic Center in Johnson City, Tennessee. The tournament winner, High Point, received the conference's automatic bid to the 2025 NCAA tournament.

== Seeds ==
All of the conference teams will compete in the tournament. The top seven teams will receive a first-round bye. Teams are seeded by record within the conference, with a tiebreaker system to seed teams with identical conference records.

The tiebreakers operate in the following order:

1. Head-to-head record.
2. Record against the top-ranked conference team not involved in the tie, going down the standings until the tie is broken. For this purpose, teams with the same conference record are considered collectively. If two teams were unbeaten or winless against an opponent but did not play the same number of games against that opponent, the tie is not considered broken.

Seed	School	Conference	Overall	Tiebreaker
1	High Point	14–2	26–5	
2	UNC Asheville	11–5	20–10	1–1 vs. High Point
3	Winthrop	11–5	21–10	0–2 vs. High Point
4	Radford	9–7	19–12	
5	Presbyterian	7–9	14–17	2–0 vs. Longwood
6	Longwood	7–9	18–13	0–2 vs. Presbyterian
7	Charleston Southern	6–10	10–21	
8	Gardner–Webb	5–11	10–19	
9	USC Upstate	2–14	6–25	

== Schedule ==
Game	Time*	Matchup	Score	Channel
Opening round - Wednesday, March 5
1	7:30 pm	No. 8 Gardner–Webb vs No. 9 USC Upstate	83–63	ESPN+
Quarterfinals - Friday March 7
2	12:00 pm	No. 1 High Point vs No. 8 Gardner–Webb	85–64	ESPN+
3	2:30 pm	No. 4 Radford vs No. 5 Presbyterian	74–69^{OT}	ESPN+
4	6:00 pm	No. 2 UNC Asheville vs. No. 7 Charleston Southern	80–60	ESPN+
5	8:30 pm	No. 3 Winthrop vs No. 6 Longwood	88–79	ESPN+
Semifinals - Saturday, March 8
6	12:00 pm	No. 1 High Point vs No. 4 Radford	76–73	ESPN+
7	2:30 pm	No. 2 UNC Asheville vs No. 3 Winthrop	67–86	ESPN+
Championship - Sunday, March 9
8	12:00 pm	No. 1 High Point vs No. 3 Winthrop	81–69	ESPN2
*Game times in EST through the semifinals and EDT for the championship.

== Bracket ==
Opening round Wednesday, March 5 ESPN+
8	Gardner–Webb	83
9	USC Upstate	63

Quarterfinals; Friday, March 7 ESPN+
1	High Point	85
8	Gardner–Webb	64
4	Radford	74^{OT}
5	Presbyterian	69
2	UNC Asheville	80
7	Charleston Southern	60
3	Winthrop	88
6	Longwood	79

Semifinals; Saturday, March 8 ESPN+
1	High Point	76
4	Radford	73
2	UNC Asheville	67
3	Winthrop	86

Championship; Sunday, March 9 ESPN2
1	High Point	81
3	Winthrop	69
