= 2024–25 South Carolina Gamecocks men's basketball team =

American men's college basketball team

2024–25 South Carolina Gamecocks men's basketball
- Conference: Southeastern Conference
- Record: 12–20 (2–16 SEC)
- Head coach: Lamont Paris (3rd season)
- Assistant coaches: Tanner Bronson (3rd season); Eddie Shannon (3rd season); Will Bailey (1st season)
- Home arena: Colonial Life Arena

2024–25 Southeastern Conference men's basketball standings
	Conf.				Overall
Team	W		L	PCT	W		L	PCT
No. 4 Auburn	15	–	3	.833	32	–	6	.842
No. 1 Florida †	14	–	4	.778	36	–	4	.900
No. 6 Alabama	13	–	5	.722	28	–	9	.757
No. 5 Tennessee	12	–	6	.667	30	–	8	.789
No. 19 Texas A&M	11	–	7	.611	23	–	11	.676
No. 12 Kentucky	10	–	8	.556	24	–	12	.667
Missouri	10	–	8	.556	22	–	12	.647
No. 18 Ole Miss	10	–	8	.556	24	–	12	.667
No. 20 Arkansas	8	–	10	.444	22	–	14	.611
Mississippi State	8	–	10	.444	21	–	13	.618
Georgia	8	–	10	.444	20	–	13	.606
Vanderbilt	8	–	10	.444	20	–	13	.606
Texas	6	–	12	.333	19	–	16	.543
Oklahoma	6	–	12	.333	20	–	14	.588
LSU	3	–	15	.167	14	–	18	.438
South Carolina	2	–	16	.111	12	–	20	.375
† 2025 SEC tournament winner Rankings from AP poll

The 2024–25 South Carolina Gamecocks men's basketball team represented the University of South Carolina during the 2024–25 NCAA Division I men's basketball season. The team was led by third-year head coach Lamont Paris and played their home games at Colonial Life Arena located in Columbia, South Carolina as a member of the Southeastern Conference.

South Carolina finished bottom of the table in the SEC and was one of only two SEC teams to not make the NCAA tournament (the other being LSU).

== Previous season ==
The Gamecocks finished the 2023–24 season 26–8, 13–5 in SEC play to finish in a tie for second place. As the No. 5 seed in the SEC tournament, they beat Arkansas in the second round before falling to Auburn in the quarterfinals. The Gamecocks earned an at-large bid to the NCAA Tournament, their first since 2017. However, they would fall in the first round to Oregon, 87–73.

== Offseason ==
=== Departures ===
Departures
Name	Number	Pos.	Height	Weight	Year	Hometown	Reason for departure
Ebrima Dibba	0	G	6'5"	214	RS Senior	Bredäng, Sweden	Transferred to Cleveland State
B.J. Mack	2	F	6'8"	260	Graduate student	Charlotte, North Carolina	Exhausted eligibility
Stephen Clark	4	F	6'8"	208	Graduate student	Charlotte, North Carolina	Exhausted eligibility
Meechie Johnson	5	G	6'2"	184	Junior	Cleveland, Ohio	Transferred back to Ohio State
Eli Sparkman	14	G	6'0"	160	Sophomore	Cleveland, Tennessee	Walk-on; didn't return
Danny Grajzl	20	G	6'0"	175	Freshman	Cleveland, Ohio	Walk-on; didn't return
Josh Gray	33	F	7'0"	265	Senior	Brooklyn, New York	Transferred to Missouri
Ta'Lon Cooper	55	G	6'4"	200	Graduate student	Roebuck, South Carolina	Exhausted eligibility

=== Incoming transfers ===
Incoming transfers
Name	Number	Pos.	Height	Weight	Year	Hometown	Previous school
Jordan Butler	0	F	7'0"	240	Sophomore	Mauldin, South Carolina	Missouri
Nick Pringle	5	F	6'10"	220	Graduate student	Seabrook, South Carolina	Alabama
Jamarii Thomas	6	G	5'11"	190	Senior	Greensboro, North Carolina	Norfolk State

=== Recruiting class ===
College recruiting information
Name	Hometown	School	Height	Weight	Commit date
Cam Scott; SG	Lexington, South Carolina	Lexington High School	6 ft 5 in (1.96 m)	185 lb (84 kg)	Apr 17, 2024
Cam Scott; SG	Recruit ratings: Rivals: 247Sports: ESPN: (88)				
Overall recruit ranking:
Note: In many cases, Scout, Rivals, 247Sports, On3, and ESPN may conflict in their listings of height and weight.; In these cases, the average was taken. ESPN grades are on a 100-point scale.; Sources: "2024 Team Ranking". Rivals.

== Preseason ==
On October 14, 2024 the SEC released their preseason media poll. South Carolina was picked to finish eleventh in the SEC regular season. Sophomore forward Collin Murray-Boyles was named to the Third Team All-SEC.

=== SEC media poll ===
SEC media poll
Predicted finish	Team
1	Alabama
2	Auburn
3	Tennessee
4	Arkansas
5	Texas A&M
6	Florida
7	Texas
8	Kentucky
9	Ole Miss
10	Mississippi State
11	South Carolina
12	Georgia
13	Missouri
14	LSU
15	Oklahoma
16	Vanderbilt

== Roster ==
2024–25 South Carolina Gamecocks men's basketball team
Players
Coaches

Pos.	#	Name	Height	Weight	Year	Previous school	Hometown
F	0	Jordan Butler	7 ft 0 in (2.13 m)	240 lb (109 kg)	So	Missouri	Mauldin, South Carolina
G	1	Jacobi Wright	6 ft 2 in (1.88 m)	185 lb (84 kg)	Sr	Legacy Early College	Fort Mill, South Carolina
G	2	Zachary Davis	6 ft 7 in (2.01 m)	200 lb (91 kg)	Jr	Denmark-Olar High School	Orangeburg, South Carolina
G	4	Weston Coggeshall (W)	6 ft 2 in (1.88 m)	175 lb (79 kg)	Fr	Philip Simmons High School	Charleston, South Carolina
F	5	Nick Pringle	6 ft 10 in (2.08 m)	220 lb (100 kg)	GS	Alabama	Seabrook, South Carolina
G	6	Jamarii Thomas	5 ft 11 in (1.8 m)	190 lb (86 kg)	Sr	Norfolk State	Greensboro, North Carolina
G	10	Myles Stute	6 ft 6 in (1.98 m)	210 lb (95 kg)	Sr	Vanderbilt	Washington, D.C.
G	13	Austin Herro	6 ft 3 in (1.91 m)	180 lb (82 kg)	RS Fr	Whitnall High School	Milwaukee, Wisconsin
G	14	Lance Piper (W)	6 ft 5 in (1.96 m)	180 lb (82 kg)	Fr	The Phelps School	Holtsville, New York
G	15	Morris Ugusuk	6 ft 4 in (1.93 m)	170 lb (77 kg)	So	Drive Basketball Academy	Helsinki, Finland
G	21	Arden Conyers	6 ft 7 in (2.01 m)	212 lb (96 kg)	RS Fr	Westwood High School	Columbia, South Carolina
G	23	Cam Scott	6 ft 6 in (1.98 m)	170 lb (77 kg)	Fr	Lexington High School	Lexington, South Carolina
F	30	Collin Murray-Boyles	6 ft 8 in (2.03 m)	245 lb (111 kg)	So	Wasatch Academy	Columbia, South Carolina
F	31	Benjamin Bosmans-Verdonk	6 ft 9 in (2.06 m)	240 lb (109 kg)	GS	Illinois	Lommel, Belgium

Head coach

- Lamont Paris (Wooster)

Assistant coach(es)

- Tanner Bronson (Wisconsin)
- Eddie Shannon (Florida)
- Will Bailey (UAB)
- David McKinley (Ohio)

Legend

- (C) Team captain
- (S) Suspended
- (I) Ineligible
- (W) Walk-on
- Injured
- Current redshirt

Roster
Last update: December 6, 2024

== Schedule and results ==
Date time, TV	Rank^{#}	Opponent^{#}	Result	Record	High points	High rebounds	High assists	Site (attendance) city, state
Exhibition
October 30, 2024*; 7:00 p.m.		Wooster	W 86–60	–	19 – Murray-Boyles	11 – Murray-Boyles	5 – Wright	Colonial Life Arena (3,506); Columbia, SC
Non-conference regular season
November 4, 2024*; 7:00 p.m., SECN+/ESPN+		North Florida	L 71–74	0–1	17 – Murray-Boyles	9 – Pringle	6 – Wright	Colonial Life Arena (12,388); Columbia, SC
November 8, 2024*; 7:00 p.m., SECN+/ESPN+		South Carolina State	W 86–64	1–1	20 – Wright	16 – Murray-Boyles	4 – Tied	Colonial Life Arena (12,205); Columbia, SC
November 12, 2024*; 7:00 p.m., SECN+/ESPN+		Towson	W 80–54	2–1	27 – Murray-Boyles	9 – Tied	5 – Thomas	Colonial Life Arena (11,577); Columbia, SC
November 16, 2024*; 3:00 p.m., Peacock		at No. 16 Indiana	L 71–87	2–2	18 – Ugusuk	11 – Pringle	4 – Thomas	Simon Skjodt Assembly Hall (17,222); Bloomington, IN
November 21, 2024*; 7:00 p.m., SECN+/ESPN+		Mercer	W 84–72	3–2	19 – Thomas	9 – Murray-Boyles	5 – Wright	Colonial Life Arena (11,054); Columbia, SC
November 25, 2024*; 8:30 p.m., FS1		vs. No. 22 Xavier; Fort Myers Tip-Off Beach Division semifinals	L 66–75	3–3	13 – Murray-Boyles	6 – Tied	2 – Tied	Suncoast Credit Union Arena (3,500); Fort Myers, FL
November 27, 2024*; 6:00 p.m., FS1		vs. Virginia Tech; Fort Myers Tip-Off Beach Division consolation game	W 70–60	4–3	16 – Murray-Boyles	8 – Murray-Boyles	3 – Davis	Suncoast Credit Union Arena (3,500); Fort Myers, FL
December 3, 2024*; 7:00 p.m., ACCN		at Boston College; ACC–SEC Challenge	W 73–51	5–3	16 – Murray-Boyles	14 – Murray-Boyles	5 – Thomas	Conte Forum (4,607); Chestnut Hill, MA
December 7, 2024*; 2:00 p.m., SECN+/ESPN+		East Carolina	W 75–68	6–3	22 – Thomas	10 – Tied	7 – Thomas	Colonial Life Arena (10,997); Columbia, SC
December 14, 2024*; 2:00 p.m., SECN+/ESPN+		USC Upstate	W 73–53	7–3	19 – Pringle	11 – Murray-Boyles	6 – Wright	Colonial Life Arena (11,092); Columbia, SC
December 17, 2024*; 7:00 p.m., SECN		No. 25 Clemson; Rivalry	W 91–88 ^{OT}	8–3	22 – Murray-Boyles	9 – Murray-Boyles	4 – Murray-Boyles	Colonial Life Arena (12,780); Columbia, SC
December 22, 2024*; 2:00 p.m., SECN+/ESPN+		Radford	W 74–48	9–3	18 – Thomas	8 – Pringle	4 – Pringle	Colonial Life Arena (10,831); Columbia, SC
December 30, 2024*; 7:00 p.m., SECN		Presbyterian	W 69–59	10–3	22 – Murray-Boyles	9 – Murray-Boyles	6 – Thomas	Colonial Life Arena (10,525); Columbia, SC
SEC regular season
January 4, 2025; 2:00 p.m., SECN		at No. 17 Mississippi State	L 50–85	10–4 (0–1)	22 – Davis	10 – Murray-Boyles	6 – Thomas	Humphrey Coliseum (8,075); Starkville, MS
January 8, 2025; 7:00 p.m., SECN		No. 5 Alabama	L 68–88	10–5 (0–2)	20 – Wright	8 – Murray-Boyles	3 – Murray-Boyles	Colonial Life Arena (11,115); Columbia, SC
January 11, 2025; 1:00 p.m., SECN		No. 2 Auburn	L 63–66	10–6 (0–3)	25 – Murray-Boyles	10 – Pringle	4 – Wright	Colonial Life Arena (13,390); Columbia, SC
January 15, 2025; 6:00 p.m., SECN		at Vanderbilt	L 63–66	10–7 (0–4)	20 – Ugusuk	10 – Wright	2 – Tied	Memorial Gymnasium (6,443); Nashville, TN
January 18, 2025; 4:00 p.m., ESPNU		at Oklahoma	L 62–82	10–8 (0–5)	15 – Ugusuk	10 – Murray-Boyles	5 – Wright	Lloyd Noble Center (7,264); Norman, OK
January 22, 2025; 7:00 p.m., SECN		No. 5 Florida	L 69–70	10–9 (0–6)	22 – Davis	7 – Pringle	8 – Murray-Boyles	Colonial Life Arena (14,930); Columbia, SC
January 25, 2025; 1:00 p.m., SECN		No. 14 Mississippi State	L 60–65 ^{OT}	10–10 (0–7)	19 – Thomas	12 – Tied	2 – Tied	Colonial Life Arena (13,203); Columbia, SC
January 28, 2025; 7:00 p.m., SECN		at Georgia	L 60–71	10–11 (0–8)	19 – Thomas	6 – Pringle	5 – Murray-Boyles	Stegeman Coliseum (7,062); Athens, GA
February 1, 2025; 8:30 p.m., SECN		No. 13 Texas A&M	L 72–76	10–12 (0–9)	22 – Murray-Boyles	7 – Murray-Boyles	6 – Murray-Boyles	Colonial Life Arena (12,856); Columbia, SC
February 8, 2025; 12:00 p.m., ESPN2		at No. 14 Kentucky	L 57–80	10–13 (0–10)	14 – Murray-Boyles	9 – Pringle	2 – Thomas	Rupp Arena (20,003); Lexington, KY
February 12, 2025; 7:00 p.m., SECN		No. 19 Ole Miss	L 68–72	10–14 (0–11)	20 – Murray-Boyles	10 – Davis	3 – Murray-Boyles	Colonial Life Arena (10,974); Columbia, SC
February 15, 2025; 8:30 p.m., SECN		at No. 3т Florida	L 67–88	10–15 (0–12)	13 – Wright	4 – Tied	4 – Thomas	O'Connell Center (10,853); Gainesville, FL
February 18, 2025; 9:00 p.m., SECN		at LSU	L 67–81	10–16 (0–13)	23 – Thomas	10 – Murray-Boyles	3 – Tied	Pete Maravich Assembly Center (7,403); Baton Rouge, LA
February 22, 2025; 8:30 p.m., SECN		Texas	W 84–69	11–16 (1–13)	22 – Murray-Boyles	10 – Murray-Boyles	3 – Wright	Colonial Life Arena (11,369); Columbia, SC
February 25, 2025; 9:00 p.m., ESPNU		at No. 14 Missouri	L 71–101	11–17 (1–14)	27 – Murray-Boyles	7 – Murray-Boyles	3 – Thomas	Mizzou Arena (12,595); Columbia, MO
March 1, 2025; 1:00 p.m., SECN		Arkansas	W 72–53	12–17 (2–14)	35 – Murray-Boyles	10 – Davis	5 – Davis	Colonial Life Arena (11,754); Columbia, SC
March 4, 2025; 6:00 p.m., SECN		Georgia	L 64–73	12–18 (2–15)	24 – Murray-Boyles	7 – Davis	5 – Murray-Boyles	Colonial Life Arena (11,633); Columbia, SC
March 8, 2025; 2:00 p.m., SECN		at No. 4 Tennessee	L 65–75	12–19 (2–16)	20 – Thomas	14 – Pringle	4 – Thomas	Thompson–Boling Arena (21,678); Knoxville, TN
SEC Tournament
March 12, 2025; 12:00 p.m., SECN	(16)	vs. (9) Arkansas; First round	L 68–72	12–20	20 – Murray-Boyles	12 – Murray-Boyles	4 – Wright	Bridgestone Arena; Nashville, TN
*Non-conference game. ^{#}Rankings from AP Poll. (#) Tournament seedings in parentheses. All times are in Eastern Time.
