= Jeremy Luther =

American basketball coach (born 1973)

Current position
- Title: Head coach
- Team: Gardner–Webb
- Conference: Big South
- Record: 15–49 (.234)

Biographical details
- Born: October 9, 1973 (age 53)
- Education: North Greenville University

Playing career
- 1992–1993: Robert Morris
- 1993–1995: Liberty
- 1995–1997: Covenant
- c. 1997: South Dakota team
- c. 1998: Athletes in Action
- Position: Guard

Coaching career (HC unless noted)
- 1998–2000: North Greenville (assistant)
- 2000–2001: Windsor Academy
- 2001–2002: Mercer (GA)
- 2002–2007: Mercer (assistant)
- 2007–2009: Newberry
- 2009–2013: Armstrong Atlantic
- 2013–2017: Gardner–Webb (assistant)
- 2017–2024: Gardner–Webb (AHC)
- 2024–present: Gardner–Webb

Head coaching record
- Overall: 15–49 (.234) (NCAA Division I)

Jeremy Luther (born October 9, 1973) is an American basketball coach who is the current head coach of the Gardner–Webb Runnin' Bulldogs men's basketball team. He played college basketball for the Robert Morris Colonials, Liberty Flames, and Covenant Scots. He has previously coached for the North Greenville Crusaders, at Windsor Academy, for the Mercer Bears, Newberry Wolves and Armstrong Atlantic Pirates.

== Early life ==
Luther grew up in Tallahassee, Florida. He attended North Florida Christian School in Tallahassee, where he played basketball, football and ran track. He was a guard in basketball and a placekicker in football. Luther then began playing college basketball for the Robert Morris Colonials in the 1992–93 season; he transferred to the Liberty Flames and played from 1993 to 1995, and then transferred to the Covenant Scots where he played from 1995 to 1997.

At Covenant, Luther scored 1,300 points across two seasons and was selected National Association of Intercollegiate Athletics (NAIA) Division II All-American as a senior, when he averaged 26.0 points-per-game. After his collegiate career, he played one season of semi-professional basketball for a team in South Dakota and then spent a year playing in overseas tournaments in Australia and New Zealand with the group Athletes in Action. He later returned to the U.S. and attended North Greenville University, receiving a bachelor's degree in 1999.

== Coaching career ==
Luther served as an assistant coach for the North Greenville Crusaders from 1998 to 2000 while attending the school. He then spent the 2000–01 season as the head coach at Windsor Academy. He was a graduate assistant with the Mercer Bears in 2001–02, and then received a promotion to assistant coach for the 2002–03 season. He remained in the position through the 2006–07 season, assisting in Mercer's Atlantic Sun Conference (ASUN) title in 2002–03, when they had 23 wins, which was the highest in program history up to that point.

Luther became the head coach of the NCAA Division II Newberry Wolves in 2007, and served two seasons in the position, totaling an overall record of 33–24 which included a school-Division II-best 21 wins in 2008–09. He left for the head coaching job of the Armstrong Atlantic Pirates in 2009–10. He totaled a record of 51–56 in four seasons before joining the NCAA Division I Gardner–Webb Runnin' Bulldogs as assistant coach in 2013. In 2017, he was promoted to associate head coach. He was promoted to head coach on March 27, 2024.

== Head coaching record ==
=== NCAA DI ===
Record table
Season	Team	Overall	Conference	Standing	Postseason
Gardner-Webb Bulldogs (Big South) (2024–present)
2024–25	Gardner-Webb	11–20	5–11	8th	
2025–26	Gardner-Webb	4–29	1–15	9th	
USC Upstate:		15–49 (.234)	6–26 (.188)		
Total:		15–49 (.234)			
National champion Postseason invitational champion Conference regular season champion Conference regular season and conference tournament champion Division regular season champion Division regular season and conference tournament champion Conference tournament champion
