= Marty Richter =

American basketball coach

Current position
- Title: Head coach
- Team: USC Upstate
- Conference: Big South
- Record: 20–49 (.290)

Biographical details
- Born: October 9, 1976 (age 50); Waterloo, Iowa, U.S.
- Education: Simpson

Coaching career (HC unless noted)
- 1999–2001: Simpson (assistant)
- 2001–2003: South Dakota (assistant)
- 2003–2007: Bowling Green (assistant)
- 2007–2008: Chipola (assistant)
- 2008–2009: BC Budivelnyk (assistant)
- 2009–2010: Chipola (assistant)
- 2011–2015: Florida Gulf Coast (assistant)
- 2016–2018: Florida Southwestern State
- 2018–2024: Drake (assistant)
- 2024–present: USC Upstate

Head coaching record
- Overall: 20–49 (.290) (NCAA); 56–10 (.848) (NJCAA)

Marty Richter (born October 9, 1976) is an American basketball coach. He is currently the head coach of the USC Upstate Spartans men's basketball team.

== Career ==
After graduating from Simpson College in 1999, Richter coached as an assistant at his alma mater for three seasons. He then went on to coach at South Dakota, Bowling Green, and Chipola before coaching for BC Budivelnyk in Ukraine. He also worked as a video coordinator for Indiana in 2008 and a scout for ESPN from 2009 to 2011. Richter then served as an assistant coach at Florida Gulf Coast from 2011 to 2015, before accepting his first head coaching job at Florida Southwestern State College. In two seasons as head coach, he finished with a 56–10 record before accepting a job as an assistant at Drake.

On April 5, 2024, Richter was named the next head coach at USC Upstate, replacing Dave Dickerson.

== Head coaching record ==
=== NCAA DI ===
Record table
Season	Team	Overall	Conference	Standing	Postseason
USC Upstate (Big South) (2024–present)
2024–25	USC Upstate	6–26	2–14	9th	
2025–26	USC Upstate	13–19	5–11	8th	
2026–27	USC Upstate	1–4	0–0		
USC Upstate:		20–49 (.290)	7–25 (.219)		
Total:		20–49 (.290)			
National champion Postseason invitational champion Conference regular season champion Conference regular season and conference tournament champion Division regular season champion Division regular season and conference tournament champion Conference tournament champion
