= Quinton Ferrell =

American basketball coach (born 1985)

Current position
- Title: Head coach
- Team: Presbyterian
- Conference: Big South
- Record: 77–140 (.355)

Biographical details
- Born: September 29, 1985 (age 41); North Augusta, South Carolina, U.S.

Playing career
- 2003–2007: Presbyterian

Coaching career (HC unless noted)
- 2007–2012: Presbyterian (assistant)
- 2012–2013: The Citadel (assistant)
- 2013–2014: Army (assistant)
- 2014–2019: Charleston (assistant)
- 2019–present: Presbyterian

Head coaching record
- Overall: 77–140 (.355)
- Tournaments: 0–2 (CBI)

Quinton Ferrell (born September 29, 1985) is an American college basketball coach and the current head men's basketball coach at Presbyterian College.

== Playing career ==
Farrell played basketball for Presbyterian from 2003 to 2007. A team captain his senior year, he led the Blue Hose in assists and steals in his final two seasons. He was twice named the teams Most Valuable Defensive Player.

== Coaching career ==
After he graduated, he joined his alma mater as an assistant coach for five seasons. His first season, he helped transition Presbyterian from NCAA Division II status into NCAA Division I. He recruited two of the top scorers in school history, bringing in Khalid Mutakabbir and Al’Lonzo Coleman, who both earned All-Big South Conference two times in their careers. He joined The Citadel as an assistant coach in 2012, while his main focus working with the perimeter players.

He then spent one season at Army as an assistant, working closely with the guards, before he joined the College of Charleston in 2014. He would spend five seasons at CoC, helping to guide the Cougars to three consecutive 20-win seasons, and an NCAA Tournament berth.

He was announced as the 19th head coach in school history at Presbyterian on April 11, 2019, after former head coach Dustin Kerns took the vacant head coaching position at Appalachian State.

== Head coaching record ==
Record table
Season	Team	Overall	Conference	Standing	Postseason
Presbyterian Blue Hose (Big South) (2019–present)
2019–20	Presbyterian	10–22	7–11	T–7th	
2020–21	Presbyterian	7–15	5–12	10th	
2021–22	Presbyterian	12–20	4–12	5th (South)	
2022–23	Presbyterian	5–27	1–17	10th	
2023–24	Presbyterian	14–19	6–10	T–5th	CBI First Round
2024–25	Presbyterian	14–19	7–9	T–5th	CBI First Round
2025–26	Presbyterian	15–18	7–9	6th	
2026–27	Presbyterian	0–0	0–0		
Presbyterian:		77–140 (.355)	37–80 (.316)		
Total:		77–140 (.355)			
National champion Postseason invitational champion Conference regular season champion Conference regular season and conference tournament champion Division regular season champion Division regular season and conference tournament champion Conference tournament champion
