= Alan Huss =

American basketball coach (born 1979)

Current position
- Title: Head coach
- Team: Creighton
- Conference: Big East
- Record: 4–1 (.800)

Biographical details
- Born: January 15, 1979 (age 47); Decatur, Illinois, U.S.

Playing career
- 1997–2001: Creighton

Coaching career (HC unless noted)
- 2004–2006: Eisenhower HS (assistant)
- 2006–2007: Decatur Christian HS
- 2007–2010: Culver Military
- 2010–2014: La Lumiere School
- 2014–2017: New Mexico (assistant)
- 2017–2023: Creighton (assistant)
- 2023–2025: High Point
- 2025–2026: Creighton (associate HC)
- 2026–present: Creighton

Head coaching record
- Overall: 60–16 (.789)
- Tournaments: 0–1 (NCAA Division I); 2–1 (CBI)

Accomplishments and honors

Championships
- Big South tournament (2025); 2 Big South regular season (2024, 2025)

Awards
- 2× Big South Coach of the Year (2024, 2025)

Alan Huss (born January 15, 1979) is an American basketball coach who is currently the head coach for the Creighton Bluejays men's basketball team. He previously served as head coach at High Point from 2023 to 2025.

== Playing career ==
Huss played for North Kansas City High School where he averaged 26 points and 12 rebounds per game his senior year.

Huss then played college basketball at Creighton under Dana Altman from 1997 to 2001 where he was teammates with Kyle Korver and part of three NCAA tournament teams. He played in 94 games over the four years averaging 3.2 points per game.

== Coaching career ==
High school and assistant coaching

Huss entered coaching at the high school ranks in 2004, working his way up to becoming the head coach at Culver Military Academy in 2007 before moving on to La Lumiere School. At La Lumiere, Huss would compile a 102–19 record in four seasons. His first job in the college ranks would come via New Mexico, under Craig Neal from 2014 to 2017 before returning to his alma mater to join Greg McDermott's staff at Creighton.

High Point

On March 27, 2023, Huss was named the 14th head coach in High Point history, replacing G.G. Smith. He had success his first year with the Panthers, winning the Joe B. Hall mid-season coaching award, which honors the top first-time head coach in Division I college basketball. High Point concluded the regular season as the Big South regular season champions, and Huss was named the Big South Coach of the Year. By the end of the season, High Point finished with a 27–9 record, the most single-season wins since the 1978–79 team, and was the runner-up in the 2024 College Basketball Invitational.

In his second year as head coach, Huss again led High Point to being the Big South regular season champions. As a result, Huss was named a finalist for the Hugh Durham Award, and became the first coach to win the Big South Coach of the Year award for two consecutive years. Huss also received a contract extension from High Point. In the 2025 Big South Tournament, Huss led High Point to winning the championship and reaching the NCAA Tournament for the first time in school history.

=== Return to Creighton ===
After the 2024–25 season, Huss was named the associate head coach back at Creighton. Huss' position stipulated he would become the next head coach at Creighton when current coach Greg McDermott retired.

On March 23, 2026, McDermott announced that he would retire at the end of the 2025–26 season, and that Huss would replace him as head coach starting in the 2026–27 season.

== Head coaching record ==
=== NCAA Division I ===
Record table
Season	Team	Overall	Conference	Standing	Postseason
High Point Panthers (Big South) (2023–2025)
2023–24	High Point	27–9	13–3	1st	CBI Runner–up
2024–25	High Point	29–6	14–2	1st	NCAA Division I Round of 64
High Point:		56–15 (.789)	27–5 (.844)		
Creighton Bluejays (Big East) (2026–present)
2026–27	Creighton	4–1	0–0		
Creighton:		4–1 (.800)	0–0 (–)		
Total:		60–16 (.789)			
National champion Postseason invitational champion Conference regular season champion Conference regular season and conference tournament champion Division regular season champion Division regular season and conference tournament champion Conference tournament champion
