= Joan Perry Brock Center =

Indoor arena in Farmville, Virginia

- JPB
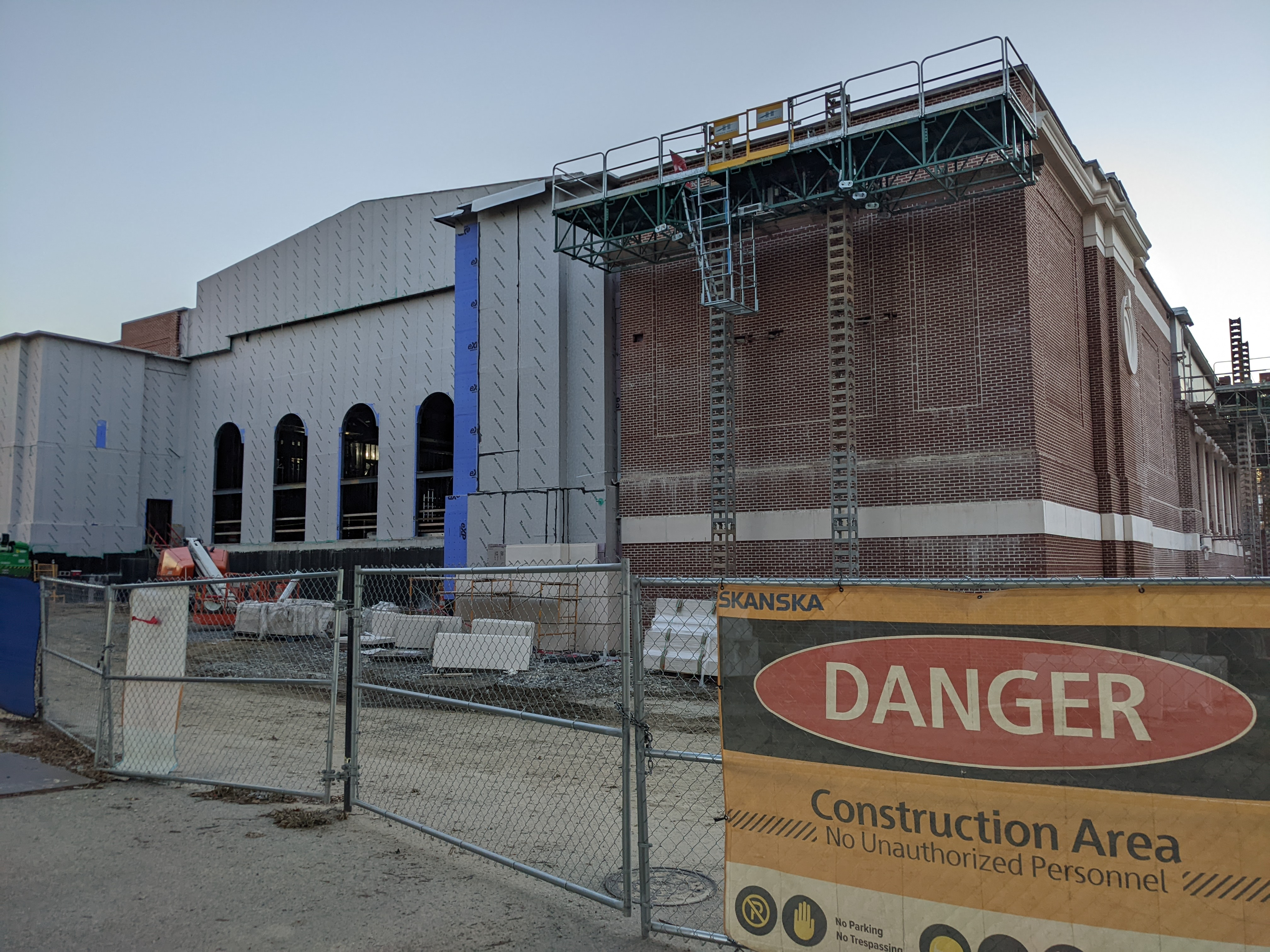
- Joan Perry Brock Center under construction in 2022.
- Interactive map of Joan Perry Brock Center
- Address: 405 Spruce Street; Farmville, VA
- Coordinates: 37°17′54″N 78°23′44″W
- Owner: Longwood University
- Operator: CENTERS
- Capacity: 3,000 (basketball)

Construction
- Groundbreaking: May 2021
- Opened: August 25, 2023
- Cost: $40 million
- Architects: RRMM and AECOM
- Builder: Skanska USA

Tenant
- Longwood Lancers (NCAA) 2023–present

Website
- Joan Perry Brock Center

The Joan Perry Brock Center is a 3,000-seat indoor multi-use arena and convocation center, located on the campus of Longwood University in Farmville, Virginia. The arena is home to the university's men's and women's basketball programs, replacing Willett Hall.

The arena is named after Joan Brock, a philanthropist and 1964 alumna, who provided $15 million, the largest gift in Longwood University's history. Like Willett Hall the basketball court is named after former Longwood basketball player Jerome Kersey, officially making the hardwood Jerome Kersey Court.

== Architecture/Design ==
The center was designed to reinforce the historical traditional Jeffersonian architecture and features the traditional campus palette of red brick and light colored trim, with a series of continuous arches of precast stone. Elements like wood paneling and the student bleachers were influenced by the Palestra and Cameron Indoor Stadium.

The arena features a removable grandstand to allow a stage for concerts and convocations. Premium seating includes the president's suite and unique opera boxes in each of the corners.

== Arena usage ==
=== Sports ===
The arena is the home court for both the men's and women's basketball programs at Longwood University, and held its first game on November 11, 2023.

=== Other events ===
The venue's first public event was a sold-out concert by Oliver Anthony.

== See also ==
- List of NCAA Division I basketball arenas
