= List of Longwood Lancers men's basketball head coaches =

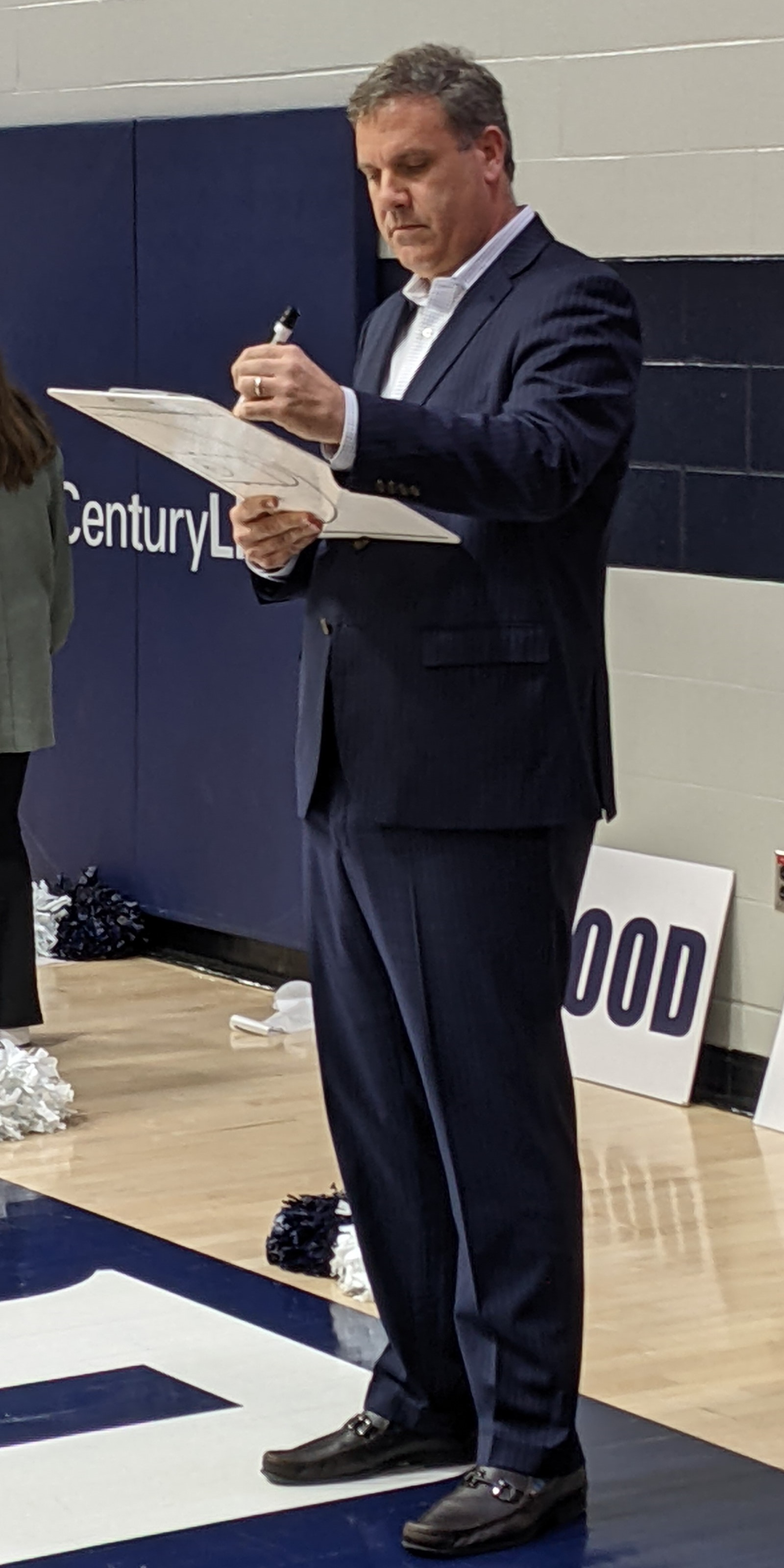
Griff Aldrich, the former head coach of the Longwood Lancers.

The following is a list of Longwood Lancers men's basketball head coaches. There have been ten head coaches of the Lancers in their 50-season history.

Longwood's current head coach is Ronnie Thomas. He was promoted as the Lancers' head coach in March 2025, replacing Griff Aldrich, who was head coach for seven seasons until becoming associate head coach at Virginia.

No.	Tenure	Coach	Years	Record	Pct.
1	1976–1977	Allen McNamee	1	1–6	.143
2	1977–1978	Bill McAdams	1	8–16	.333
3	1978–1981	Ron Bash	3	66–20	.767
4	1981–1990	Cal Luther	9	136–105	.564
5	1990–1999	Ron Carr	9	127–124	.506
6	1999–2003	Mike Leeder	4	55–57	.491
7	2003–2013	Mike Gillian	10	93–214	.303
8	2013–2018	Jayson Gee	5	42–120	.259
9	2018–2025	Griff Aldrich	7	127–100	.559
10	2025–present	Ronnie Thomas	1	0–0	–
Totals		10 coaches	50 seasons	665–762	.466
Records updated through end of 2024–25 season Source
