= 2023–24 Presbyterian Blue Hose men's basketball team =

American college basketball season

2023–24 Presbyterian Blue Hose men's basketball
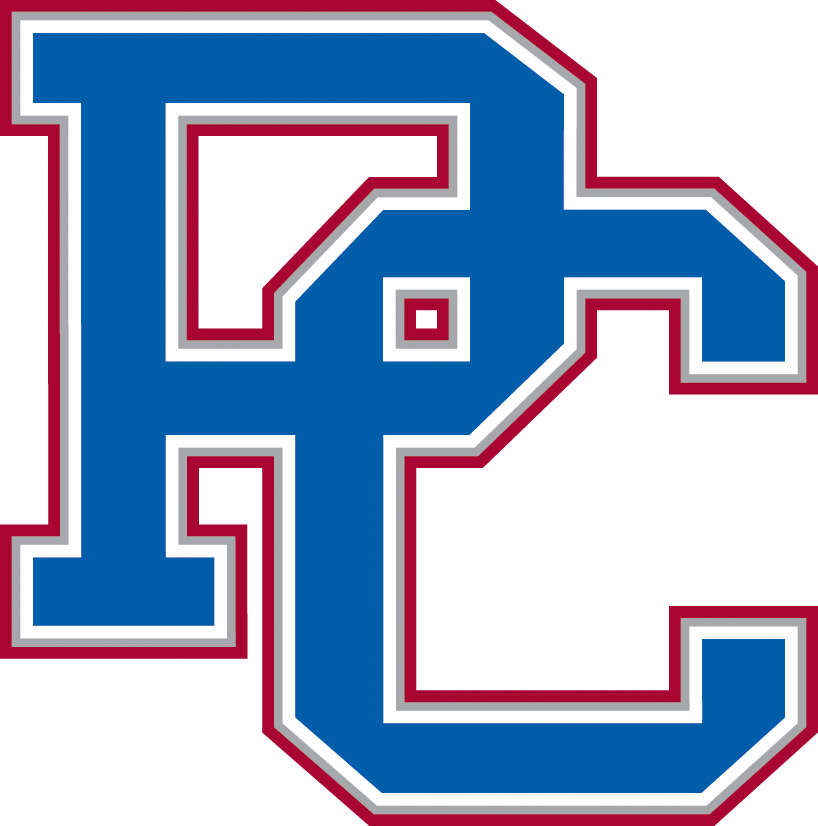

CBI, First round
- Conference: Big South Conference
- Record: 14–19 (6–10 Big South)
- Head coach: Quinton Ferrell (5th season)
- Assistant coaches: Al'lonzo Coleman; Justin Griffith; Trey Johnson
- Home arena: Templeton Physical Education Center

2023–24 Big South men's basketball standings
	Conf.				Overall
Team	W		L	PCT	W		L	PCT
High Point	13	–	3	.813	27	–	9	.750
UNC Asheville	12	–	4	.750	22	–	12	.647
Gardner–Webb	11	–	5	.688	17	–	16	.515
Winthrop	8	–	8	.500	17	–	15	.531
Longwood †	6	–	10	.375	21	–	14	.600
Presbyterian	6	–	10	.375	14	–	19	.424
Charleston Southern	6	–	10	.375	10	–	20	.333
USC Upstate	5	–	11	.313	10	–	20	.333
Radford	5	–	11	.313	16	–	17	.485
† 2024 Big South tournament winner

The 2023–24 Presbyterian Blue Hose men's basketball team represented Presbyterian College during the 2023–24 NCAA Division I men's basketball season. The Blue Hose, led by fifth-year head coach Quinton Ferrell, played their home games at the Templeton Physical Education Center in Clinton, South Carolina as members of the Big South Conference.

== Previous season ==
The Blue Hose finished the 2022–23 season 5–27, 1–17 in Big South play to finish in last place. They were defeated by Campbell in the first round of the Big South tournament.

== Roster ==
2023–24 Presbyterian Blue Hose men's basketball team
Players
Coaches

Pos.	#	Name	Height	Weight	Year	Hometown
G	0	Crosby James	6 ft 0 in (1.83 m)	185 lb (84 kg)	Sr	Columbia, South Carolina
G	1	Marquis Barnett	6 ft 4 in (1.93 m)	195 lb (88 kg)	Jr	Saginaw, Michigan
G	2	Samage Teel	6 ft 2 in (1.88 m)	175 lb (79 kg)	Jr	Greenville, North Carolina
G/F	3	Kobe Stewart	6 ft 6 in (1.98 m)	180 lb (82 kg)	Sr	Augusta, Georgia
G	4	Kory Mincy	6 ft 1 in (1.85 m)	185 lb (84 kg)	Fr	East Point, Georgia
G	5	Houston Jones	6 ft 4 in (1.93 m)	185 lb (84 kg)	So	Lexington, South Carolina
G	10	Jamahri Harvey	6 ft 4 in (1.93 m)	170 lb (77 kg)	Jr	Fayetteville, North Carolina
G	11	Quadir Pettaway	6 ft 1 in (1.85 m)	170 lb (77 kg)	So	Newport News, Virginia
G	12	Carl Parrish	6 ft 3 in (1.91 m)	185 lb (84 kg)	Fr	Miami Gardens, Florida
G	13	AJ Shaw	6 ft 1 in (1.85 m)	185 lb (84 kg)	So	Charlotte, North Carolina
F	14	Jaylen Peterson	6 ft 7 in (2.01 m)	190 lb (86 kg)	So	Stone Mountain, Georgia
F	15	Jonah Pierce	6 ft 9 in (2.06 m)	220 lb (100 kg)	Jr	Sanford, Florida
G	20	Henderson Williams	6 ft 5 in (1.96 m)	205 lb (93 kg)	Fr	Mooresville, North Carolina
G	23	Trevon Reddish-Rhone	6 ft 4 in (1.93 m)	205 lb (93 kg)	Sr	Carrollton, Georgia
F	30	Kaleb Scott	6 ft 7 in (2.01 m)	235 lb (107 kg)	Jr	Raleigh, North Carolina

Head coach

- Quinton Ferrell (Presbyterian)

Assistant coach(es)

- Al'lonzo Coleman (Presbyterian)
- Justin Griffith (North Carolina Wesleyan)
- Trey Johnson (Charleston Southern)

Legend

- (C) Team captain
- (S) Suspended
- (I) Ineligible
- (W) Walk-on
- Injured
- Current redshirt

Roster
Last update: November 11, 2023

== Schedule and results ==
Date time, TV	Rank^{#}	Opponent^{#}	Result	Record	Site (attendance) city, state
Exhibition
November 2, 2023*; 7:00 pm		Carolina Christian	W 126–57	–	Templeton Physical Education Center; Clinton, SC
Non-conference regular season
November 7, 2023*; 8:00 pm, SECN+/ESPN+		at Vanderbilt	W 68–62	1–0	Memorial Gymnasium (5,506); Nashville, TN
November 9, 2023*; 7:00 pm, ESPN+		Columbia International	W 100–58	2–0	Templeton Physical Education Center (340); Clinton, SC
November 13, 2023*; 7:00 pm, ESPN+		The Citadel	W 71–64	3–0	Templeton Physical Education Center (514); Clinton, SC
November 16, 2023*; 7:00 pm, ESPN+		at North Florida; First Coast Classic	W 81–69	4–0	UNF Arena (1,279); Jacksonville, FL
November 17, 2023*; 4:00 pm, ESPN+		vs. Maine; First Coast Classic	L 66–80	4–1	UNF Arena (144); Jacksonville, FL
November 18, 2023*; 2:00 pm, ESPN+		vs. Northwestern State; First Coast Classic	W 78–75	5–1	UNF Arena (221); Jacksonville, FL
November 22, 2023*; 2:00 pm, ESPN+		Tennessee Tech	L 75–79 ^{OT}	5–2	Templeton Physical Education Center (276); Clinton, SC
November 27, 2023*; 7:00 pm, FloHoops		at Elon	L 79–82	5–3	Schar Center (1,284); Elon, NC
December 2, 2023*; 1:00 pm, ESPN+		at VMI	W 75–71	6–3	Cameron Hall (3,310); Lexington, VA
December 6, 2023*; 7:00 pm, ESPN+		Florida A&M	L 60–65	6–4	Templeton Physical Education Center (308); Clinton, SC
December 13, 2023*; 12:00 pm, ESPN+		Mid-Atlantic Christian	W 118–51	7–4	Templeton Physical Education Center (1,007); Clinton, SC
December 16, 2023*; 2:00 pm, ESPN+		Kennesaw State	L 84–94	7–5	Templeton Physical Education Center (514); Clinton, SC
December 19, 2023*; 3:00 pm, ESPN+		at Furman	L 61–76	7–6	Timmons Arena (1,817); Greenville, SC
December 21, 2023*; 3:00 pm, ACCNX		at Wake Forest	L 68–91	7–7	LJVM Coliseum (6,775); Winston-Salem, NC
December 30, 2023*; 2:00 pm, ESPN+		Johnson & Wales (NC)	W 91–67	8–7	Templeton Physical Education Center (127); Clinton, SC
Big South Conference regular season
January 3, 2024; 7:00 pm, ESPN+		at Charleston Southern	W 68–61	9–7 (1–0)	Buccaneer Field House (587); North Charleston, SC
January 6, 2024; 2:00 pm, ESPN+		UNC Asheville	L 80–84	9–8 (1–1)	Templeton Physical Education Center (295); Clinton, SC
January 10, 2024; 7:00 pm, ESPN+		Winthrop	L 71–81	9–9 (1–2)	Templeton Physical Education Center (644); Clinton, SC
January 13, 2024; 1:00 pm, ESPN+		at Gardner–Webb	L 60–76	9–10 (1–3)	Paul Porter Arena (406); Boiling Springs, NC
January 17, 2024; 7:00 pm, ESPN+		High Point	L 83–86	9–11 (1–4)	Templeton Physical Education Center (316); Clinton, SC
January 20, 2024; 3:00 pm, ESPN+		at Longwood	L 70–80	9–12 (1–5)	Joan Perry Brock Center (2,657); Farmville, VA
January 27, 2024; 4:30 pm, ESPN+		at Radford	L 58–73	9–13 (1–6)	Dedmon Center (1,609); Radford, VA
January 31, 2024; 7:00 pm, ESPN+		USC Upstate	W 80–73	10–13 (2–6)	Templeton Physical Education Center (298); Clinton, SC
February 3, 2024; 7:00 pm, ESPN+		at High Point	L 68–78	10–14 (2–7)	Qubein Center (5,678); High Point, NC
February 7, 2024; 7:00 pm, ESPN+		Gardner–Webb	W 77–75	11–14 (3–7)	Templeton Physical Education Center (262); Clinton, SC
February 10, 2024; 4:30 pm, ESPN+		Radford	W 76–73	12–14 (4–7)	Templeton Physical Education Center (405); Clinton, SC
February 14, 2024; 6:30 pm, ESPN+		at UNC Asheville	L 69–71	12–15 (4–8)	Kimmel Arena (1,051); Asheville, NC
February 17, 2024; 2:00 pm, ESPN+		Longwood	L 73–81	12–16 (4–9)	Templeton Physical Education Center (371); Clinton, SC
February 21, 2024; 6:30 pm, ESPN+		at Winthrop	W 78–55	13–16 (5–9)	Winthrop Coliseum (2,272); Rock Hill, SC
February 28, 2024; 7:00 pm, ESPN+		at USC Upstate	L 72–74	13–17 (5–10)	G. B. Hodge Center (576); Spartanburg, SC
March 2, 2024; 2:00 pm, ESPN+		Charleston Southern	W 72–65	14–17 (6–10)	Templeton Physical Education Center (444); Clinton, SC
Big South tournament
March 8, 2024; 8:00 pm, ESPN+	(6)	vs. (3) Gardner–Webb; Quarterfinals	L 60–61	14–18	Qubein Center; High Point, NC
CBI
March 24, 2024; 1:00 pm, FloHoops	(12)	vs. (5) Montana; First round	L 79–82 ^{OT}	14–19	Ocean Center; Daytona Beach, FL
*Non-conference game. ^{#}Rankings from AP Poll. (#) Tournament seedings in parentheses. All times are in Eastern.
