= 2023–24 Longwood Lancers men's basketball team =

American college basketball season

2023–24 Longwood Lancers men's basketball

Big South tournament champions Brock Challenge champions

NCAA tournament, First Round
- Conference: Big South Conference
- Record: 21–14 (6–10 Big South)
- Head coach: Griff Aldrich (6th season)
- Associate head coach: Marty McGillan
- Assistant coaches: Ronnie Thomas; Quinn McDowell; Taylor Land
- Home arena: Joan Perry Brock Center

2023–24 Big South men's basketball standings
	Conf.				Overall
Team	W		L	PCT	W		L	PCT
High Point	13	–	3	.813	27	–	9	.750
UNC Asheville	12	–	4	.750	22	–	12	.647
Gardner–Webb	11	–	5	.688	17	–	16	.515
Winthrop	8	–	8	.500	17	–	15	.531
Longwood †	6	–	10	.375	21	–	14	.600
Presbyterian	6	–	10	.375	14	–	19	.424
Charleston Southern	6	–	10	.375	10	–	20	.333
USC Upstate	5	–	11	.313	10	–	20	.333
Radford	5	–	11	.313	16	–	17	.485
† 2024 Big South tournament winner

The 2023–24 Longwood Lancers men's basketball team represented Longwood University during the 2023–24 NCAA Division I men's basketball season. The Lancers, led by sixth-year head coach Griff Aldrich, played their home games at the newly opened Joan Perry Brock Center in Farmville, Virginia as members of the Big South Conference. They finished the season 21–14, 6–10 in Big South play to finish in a tie for fifth place. As the No. 5 seed in the Big South Tournament, they defeated Winthrop, High Point, and UNC Asheville to win the Big South tournament championship, as a result, they received the conference's automatic bid to the NCAA tournament for the second time in school history. As a No. 16 seed in the South region, they lost to Houston in the First Round.

== Previous season ==
The Lancers finished the 2022–23 season 20–12, 12–6 in Big South play to finish in a tie for second place. As the #2 seed in the Big South tournament, they were upset by #7 seed Campbell in the quarterfinals.

== Roster ==
2023–24 Longwood Lancers men's basketball team
Players
Coaches

Pos.	#	Name	Height	Weight	Year	Hometown
F	0	Gavin Burns	6 ft 9 in (2.06 m)	225 lb (102 kg)	Fr	Roanoke, Virginia
PG	1	Walyn Napper	6 ft 1 in (1.85 m)	185 lb (84 kg)	Sr	Columbia, South Carolina
G	2	Saxby Sunderland	6 ft 4 in (1.93 m)	190 lb (86 kg)	So	Arlington, Virginia
G	3	DA Houston	6 ft 1 in (1.85 m)	212 lb (96 kg)	Sr	Houston, Texas
G/F	4	Emanuel Richards	6 ft 4 in (1.93 m)	220 lb (100 kg)	Fr	Irmo, South Carolina
G	5	Johnathan Massie	6 ft 6 in (1.98 m)	188 lb (85 kg)	Jr	Houston, Texas
F	7	Johan Nziemi	6 ft 6 in (1.98 m)	225 lb (102 kg)	Jr	Manhattan, New York
G	8	Leo Nordberg	6 ft 1 in (1.85 m)	—	Fr	Helsinki, Finland
F	11	Trey Hicks	6 ft 8 in (2.03 m)	210 lb (95 kg)	Jr	Louisville, Kentucky
C	12	Szymon Zapala	7 ft 0 in (2.13 m)	240 lb (109 kg)	Jr	Zaborze, Poland
PG	13	Mateo Esmeraldo	6 ft 0 in (1.83 m)	165 lb (75 kg)	RS Fr	Monroe, Connecticut
G	20	Zach Murphy	6 ft 2 in (1.88 m)	170 lb (77 kg)	Fr	Midlothian, Virginia
G	24	Jaylen Benard	6 ft 2 in (1.88 m)	190 lb (86 kg)	Fr	Houston, Texas
F	25	Michael Christmas	6 ft 6 in (1.98 m)	225 lb (102 kg)	GS	Virginia Beach, Virginia
F	34	Elijah Tucker	6 ft 8 in (2.03 m)	225 lb (102 kg)	RS So	Canton, Georgia
F	35	Jesper Granlund	6 ft 6 in (1.98 m)	210 lb (95 kg)	Sr	Helsinki, Finland

Head coach

- Griff Aldrich (Hampden–Sydney)

Assistant coach(es)

- Marty McGillan (UNC Wilmington)
- Ronnie Thomas (Bridgewater)
- Quinn McDowell (William & Mary)
- Taylor Land (St. Edward's)

Legend

- (C) Team captain
- (S) Suspended
- (I) Ineligible
- (W) Walk-on
- Injured
- Current redshirt

Roster
Last update: November 14, 2023

== Schedule and results ==
Date time, TV	Rank^{#}	Opponent^{#}	Result	Record	Site (attendance) city, state
Non-conference regular season
November 6, 2023*; 7:00 pm, ESPN+		at St. Bonaventure	L 69–73	0–1	Reilly Center (3,577); St. Bonaventure, NY
November 11, 2023*; 2:30 pm, ESPN+		St. Mary's (MD)	W 95–43	1–1	Joan Perry Brock Center (3,000); Farmville, VA
November 15, 2023*; 8:00 pm		at Maryland Eastern Shore	W 80–61	2–1	Hytche Athletic Center (1,886); Princess Anne, MD
November 18, 2023*; 3:00 pm, ESPN+		North Carolina Central	W 73–66	3–1	Joan Perry Brock Center (1,373); Farmville, VA
November 24, 2023*; 3:00 pm, ESPN+		Delaware State; Brock Challenge	W 84–82	4–1	Joan Perry Brock Center (1,147); Farmville, VA
November 25, 2023*; 3:00 pm, ESPN+		Lamar; Brock Challenge	W 83–72	5–1	Joan Perry Brock Center (1,368); Farmville, VA
November 26, 2023*; 3:30 pm, ESPN+		Bethune–Cookman; Brock Challenge	W 69–48	6–1	Joan Perry Brock Center (1,375); Farmville, VA
November 30, 2023*; 7:00 pm, ESPN+		Newport News Apprentice	W 95–46	7–1	Joan Perry Brock Center (1,071); Farmville, VA
December 3, 2023*; 2:00 pm		at Morgan State	W 88–54	8–1	Talmadge L. Hill Field House (876); Baltimore, MD
December 9, 2023*; 2:00 pm		at Delaware State	W 62–61	9–1	Memorial Hall (1,100); Dover, DE
December 11, 2023*; 11:00 am, ESPN+		Gallaudet	W 92–61	10–1	Joan Perry Brock Center (1,537); Farmville, VA
December 13, 2023*; 8:00 pm, ESPN+		at Milwaukee	W 80–67	11–1	UW–Milwaukee Panther Arena (1,551); Milwaukee, WI
December 17, 2023*; 2:00 pm, ESPN+		VMI	W 68–49	12–1	Joan Perry Brock Center (2,337); Farmville, VA
December 20, 2023*; 3:00 pm		at North Carolina Central	L 70–79	12–2	McDougald–McLendon Arena (782); Durham, NC
December 30, 2023*; 2:00 pm, ESPN+		at Dayton	L 69–78	12–3	UD Arena (13,407); Dayton, OH
Big South Conference regular season
January 3, 2024; 6:30 pm, ESPN+		at Winthrop	L 60–68 ^{OT}	12–4 (0–1)	Winthrop Coliseum (1,426); Rock Hill, SC
January 6, 2024; 3:00 pm, ESPN+		Charleston Southern	W 77–56	13–4 (1–1)	Joan Perry Brock Center (1,423); Farmville, VA
January 10, 2024; 7:00 pm, ESPN+		Radford	L 58–69	13–5 (1–2)	Joan Perry Brock Center (2,923); Farmville, VA
January 13, 2024; 2:00 pm, ESPN+		at UNC Asheville	L 61–65	13–6 (1–3)	Kimmel Arena (1,577); Asheville, NC
January 17, 2024; 7:00 pm, ESPN+		at USC Upstate	L 71–73	13–7 (1–4)	G. B. Hodge Center (596); Spartanburg, SC
January 20, 2024; 3:00 pm, ESPN+		Presbyterian	W 80–70	14–7 (2–4)	Joan Perry Brock Center (2,657); Farmville, VA
January 24, 2024; 7:00 pm, ESPN+		Gardner–Webb	L 64–76	14–8 (2–5)	Joan Perry Brock Center (1,345); Farmville, VA
February 1, 2024; 7:00 pm, ESPNU		at High Point	L 76–93	14–9 (2–6)	Qubein Center (5,349); High Point, NC
February 3, 2024; 5:30 pm, ESPN+		at Charleston Southern	L 77–83	14–10 (2–7)	Buccaneer Field House (612); North Charleston, SC
February 7, 2024; 7:00 pm, ESPN+		USC Upstate	L 64–69	14–11 (2–8)	Joan Perry Brock Center (1,326); Farmville, VA
February 10, 2024; 3:00 pm, ESPN+		Winthrop	W 84–74	15–11 (3–8)	Joan Perry Brock Center (2,873); Farmville, VA
February 17, 2024; 2:00 pm, ESPN+		at Presbyterian	W 81–73	16–11 (4–8)	Templeton Physical Education Center (371); Clinton, SC
February 21, 2024; 7:00 pm, ESPN+		UNC Asheville	W 80–75	17–11 (5–8)	Joan Perry Brock Center (2,547); Farmville, VA
February 24, 2024; 2:00 pm, ESPN+		at Radford	L 82–88	17–12 (5–9)	Dedmon Center (1,521); Radford, VA
February 29, 2024; 7:00 pm, ESPN+		at Gardner–Webb	L 69–72	17–13 (5–10)	Paul Porter Arena (2,848); Boiling Springs, NC
March 2, 2024; 3:00 pm, ESPN+		High Point	W 74–72	18–13 (6–10)	Joan Perry Brock Center (2,753); Farmville, VA
Big South tournament
March 8, 2024; 2:00 pm, ESPN+	(5)	vs. (4) Winthrop; Quarterfinals	W 69–56	19–13	Qubein Center (4,258); High Point, NC
March 9, 2024; 12:00 pm, ESPN+	(5)	vs. (1) High Point; Semifinals	W 80–79 ^{OT}	20–13	Qubein Center; High Point, NC
March 10, 2024; 12:00 pm, ESPN2	(5)	vs. (2) UNC Asheville; Championship	W 85–59	21–13	Qubein Center; High Point, NC
NCAA tournament
March 22, 2024; 9:20 p.m., TNT	(16 S)	vs. (1 S) No. 2 Houston; First Round	L 46–86	21–14	FedExForum (13,797); Memphis, TN
*Non-conference game. ^{#}Rankings from AP Poll. (#) Tournament seedings in parentheses. S=South region. All times are in Eastern.
