= 2023–24 Radford Highlanders men's basketball team =

American college basketball season

2023–24 Radford Highlanders men's basketball
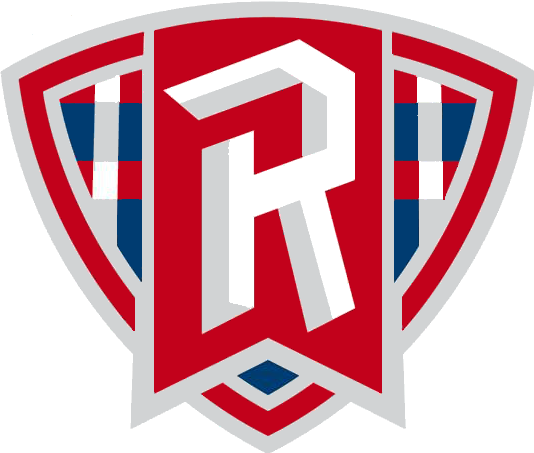

Cancún Challenge Mayan Division champions
- Conference: Big South Conference
- Record: 16–17 (5–11 Big South)
- Head coach: Darris Nichols (3rd season)
- Assistant coaches: Shane Nichols; Timothy Peete; James Haring
- Home arena: Dedmon Center

2023–24 Big South men's basketball standings
	Conf.				Overall
Team	W		L	PCT	W		L	PCT
High Point	13	–	3	.813	27	–	9	.750
UNC Asheville	12	–	4	.750	22	–	12	.647
Gardner–Webb	11	–	5	.688	17	–	16	.515
Winthrop	8	–	8	.500	17	–	15	.531
Longwood †	6	–	10	.375	21	–	14	.600
Presbyterian	6	–	10	.375	14	–	19	.424
Charleston Southern	6	–	10	.375	10	–	20	.333
USC Upstate	5	–	11	.313	10	–	20	.333
Radford	5	–	11	.313	16	–	17	.485
† 2024 Big South tournament winner

The 2023–24 Radford Highlanders men's basketball team represented Radford University during the 2023–24 NCAA Division I men's basketball season. The Highlanders, led by third-year head coach Darris Nichols, played their home games at the Dedmon Center in Radford, Virginia as members of the Big South Conference.

The Highlanders finished the season 16–17, 5–11 in Big South play, to finish in a tie for eighth place. They defeated USC Upstate before falling to top-seeded High Point in the quarterfinals of the Big South tournament.

== Previous season ==
The Highlanders finished the 2022–23 season 21–15, 12–6 in Big South play, to finish in a tie for second place. As the #3 seed in the Big South tournament, they defeated #6 seed Winthrop in the quarterfinals, before being upset by #7 seed Campbell in the semifinals. They received an invitation to the CBI, where they defeated Tarleton State and San Jose State, before losing to Charlotte in the semifinals.

== Roster ==
2023–24 Radford Highlanders men's basketball team
Players
Coaches

Pos.	#	Name	Height	Weight	Year	Hometown
F	0	Justin Archer	6 ft 7 in (2.01 m)	205 lb (93 kg)	Jr	North Brunswick, NJ
G	1	DaQuan Smith	6 ft 1 in (1.85 m)	195 lb (88 kg)	RS Sr	Holly Springs, MS
G	2	Trenton Walters	5 ft 9 in (1.75 m)	150 lb (68 kg)	Fr	Frisco, TX
G	3	Kenyon Giles	5 ft 11 in (1.8 m)	165 lb (75 kg)	So	Chesapeake, VA
G	4	Truth Harris	6 ft 2 in (1.88 m)	180 lb (82 kg)	Jr	Mount Vernon, NY
F	5	Josiah Harris	6 ft 8 in (2.03 m)	220 lb (100 kg)	Jr	Wilmington, DE
F	10	Chandler Turner	6 ft 7 in (2.01 m)	210 lb (95 kg)	GS	Detroit, MI
G	11	Kyle Burns	6 ft 2 in (1.88 m)	175 lb (79 kg)	RS Fr	Marietta, GA
F	13	Trevor Roe	6 ft 8 in (2.03 m)	200 lb (91 kg)	Fr	Syracuse, NY
G	14	Bryan Antoine	6 ft 5 in (1.96 m)	185 lb (84 kg)	Sr	Tinton Falls, NJ
C	21	D'Auntray Pierce	6 ft 10 in (2.08 m)	200 lb (91 kg)	Sr	Denver, CO
F	23	TJ NeSmith	6 ft 9 in (2.06 m)	220 lb (100 kg)	Sr	Burlington, NC
G	25	Hunter Castleberry	6 ft 3 in (1.91 m)	175 lb (79 kg)	RS Fr	Charleston, WV
F	34	David Vidor	6 ft 8 in (2.03 m)	185 lb (84 kg)	RS Fr	Budapest, Hungary
G	41	Dean Lockley	6 ft 3 in (1.91 m)	190 lb (86 kg)	Jr	Charlottesville, VA
F	54	Ibu Yamazaki	6 ft 7 in (2.01 m)	215 lb (98 kg)	So	Matsudo, Japan

Head coach

- Darris Nichols (West Virginia)

Assistant coach(es)

- Shane Nichols (Wofford)
- Timothy Peete (Tulsa)
- James Haring (West Virginia)

Legend

- (C) Team captain
- (S) Suspended
- (I) Ineligible
- (W) Walk-on
- Injured
- Current redshirt

Roster
Last update: November 14, 2023

== Schedule and results ==
Date time, TV	Rank^{#}	Opponent^{#}	Result	Record	Site (attendance) city, state
Exhibition
October 30, 2023*; 7:00 p.m.		Roanoke	W 89–72	–	Dedmon Center (1,117); Radford, VA
Non-conference regular season
November 6, 2023*; 7:00 p.m., ACCN		at No. 19 North Carolina	L 70–86	0–1	Dean Smith Center (17,331); Chapel Hill, NC
November 10, 2023*; 7:00 p.m., ESPN+		vs. Marshall	W 66–62	1–1	The Greenbrier (1,013); White Sulphur Springs, WV
November 12, 2023*; 4:30 p.m., ESPN+		Eastern Mennonite	W 84–47	2–1	Dedmon Center (1,218); Radford, VA
November 15, 2023*; 7:00 p.m., ESPN+		at VCU	L 50–73	2–2	Siegel Center (7,045); Richmond, VA
November 17, 2023*; 7:00 p.m., ESPN+		at No. 24 James Madison; Cancún Challenge campus-site game	L 73–76	2–3	Atlantic Union Bank Center (8,014); Harrisonburg, VA
November 21, 2023*; 12:30 p.m., FloHoops		vs. Morgan State; Cancún Challenge Mayan Division semifinals	W 82–72	3–3	Hard Rock Hotel Riviera Maya (107); Cancún, Mexico
November 22, 2023*; 3:00 p.m., FloHoops		vs. Northern Colorado; Cancún Challenge Mayan Division championship	W 79–68	4–3	Hard Rock Hotel Riviera Maya; Cancún, Mexico
November 26, 2023*; 2:00 p.m., ESPN+		Notre Dame (MD)	W 100–53	5–3	Dedmon Center (835); Radford, VA
November 29, 2023*; 7:00 p.m., ESPN+		at Old Dominion	L 68–69	5–4	Chartway Arena (5,292); Norfolk, VA
December 3, 2023*; 2:00 p.m., ESPN+		Elon	W 82–72	6–4	Dedmon Center (1,514); Radford, VA
December 9, 2023*; 4:30 p.m., ESPN+		North Carolina Central	W 82–74	7–4	Dedmon Center (839); Radford, VA
December 12, 2023*; 7:00 p.m., ESPN+		VMI	W 73–56	8–4	Dedmon Center (1,413); Radford, VA
December 16, 2023*; 3:30 p.m., ESPN+		at Bucknell	W 70–63	9–4	Sojka Pavilion (892); Lewisburg, PA
December 20, 2023*; 7:00 p.m., ESPN+		at West Virginia	W 66–65	10–4	WVU Coliseum (9,019); Morgantown, WV
December 29, 2023*; 7:00 p.m., ACCNX		at No. 18 Clemson	L 58–93	10–5	Littlejohn Coliseum (7,276); Clemson, SC
Big South Conference regular season
January 3, 2024; 7:00 p.m., ESPN+		High Point	L 71–85	10–6 (0–1)	Dedmon Center (1,142); Radford, VA
January 10, 2024; 7:00 p.m., ESPN+		at Longwood	W 69–58	11–6 (1–1)	Joan Perry Brock Center (2,823); Farmville, VA
January 13, 2024; 2:00 p.m., ESPN+		at Winthrop	L 88–92 ^{3OT}	11–7 (1–2)	Winthrop Coliseum (2,092); Rock Hill, SC
January 17, 2024; 7:00 p.m., ESPN+		Gardner–Webb	L 68–74	11–8 (1–3)	Dedmon Center (1,615); Radford, VA
January 20, 2024; 2:00 p.m., ESPN+		USC Upstate	W 64–61	12–8 (2–3)	Dedmon Center (1,331); Radford, VA
January 24, 2024; 6:30 p.m., ESPN+		at UNC Asheville	L 69–81	12–9 (2–4)	Kimmel Arena (1,768); Asheville, NC
January 27, 2024; 4:30 p.m., ESPN+		Presbyterian	W 73–58	13–9 (3–4)	Dedmon Center (1,609); Radford, VA
January 31, 2024; 7:00 p.m., ESPN+		Charleston Southern	L 60–63	13–10 (3–5)	Dedmon Center (1,332); Radford, VA
February 3, 2024; 4:00 p.m., ESPN+		at USC Upstate	L 69–78	13–11 (3–6)	G. B. Hodge Center (495); Spartanburg, SC
February 10, 2024; 4:30 p.m., ESPN+		at Presbyterian	L 73–76	13–12 (3–7)	Templeton Physical Education Center (405); Clinton, SC
February 15, 2024; 8:00 p.m., ESPN+		Winthrop	L 69–85	13–13 (3–8)	Dedmon Center (1,404); Radford, VA
February 17, 2024; 7:00 p.m., ESPN+		at High Point	L 74–99	13–14 (3–9)	Qubein Center (4,935); High Point, NC
February 22, 2024; 7:00 p.m., ESPNU		at Gardner–Webb	W 90–74	14–14 (4–9)	Paul Porter Arena (1,298); Boiling Springs, NC
February 24, 2024; 2:00 p.m., ESPN+		Longwood	W 88–82	15–14 (5–9)	Dedmon Center (1,521); Radford, VA
February 28, 2024; 7:00 p.m., ESPN+		at Charleston Southern	L 57–58	15–15 (5–10)	Buccaneer Field House (567); North Charleston, SC
March 2, 2024; 2:00 p.m., ESPN+		UNC Asheville	L 62–71	15–16 (5–11)	Dedmon Center (1,103); Radford, VA
Big South tournament
March 6, 2024; 8:00 p.m., ESPN+	(9)	vs. (8) USC Upstate; First round	W 67–60	16–16	Qubein Center; High Point, NC
March 8, 2024; 12:00 p.m., ESPN+	(9)	vs. (1) High Point; Quarterfinals	L 63–77	16–17	Qubein Center (4,258); High Point, NC
*Non-conference game. ^{#}Rankings from AP poll. (#) Tournament seedings in parentheses. All times are in Eastern.
