= 2023–24 USC Upstate Spartans men's basketball team =

Basketball team season

2023–24 USC Upstate Spartans men's basketball
- Conference: Big South Conference
- Record: 10–20 (5–11 Big South)
- Head coach: Dave Dickerson (6th season)
- Associate head coach: Andrew Garcia
- Assistant coaches: Chris Logsdon; Nori Johnson
- Home arena: G. B. Hodge Center

2023–24 Big South men's basketball standings
	Conf.				Overall
Team	W		L	PCT	W		L	PCT
High Point	13	–	3	.813	27	–	9	.750
UNC Asheville	12	–	4	.750	22	–	12	.647
Gardner–Webb	11	–	5	.688	17	–	16	.515
Winthrop	8	–	8	.500	17	–	15	.531
Longwood †	6	–	10	.375	21	–	14	.600
Presbyterian	6	–	10	.375	14	–	19	.424
Charleston Southern	6	–	10	.375	10	–	20	.333
USC Upstate	5	–	11	.313	10	–	20	.333
Radford	5	–	11	.313	16	–	17	.485
† 2024 Big South tournament winner

The 2023–24 USC Upstate Spartans men's basketball team represented the University of South Carolina Upstate during the 2023–24 NCAA Division I men's basketball season. The Spartans, led by sixth-year head coach Dave Dickerson, played their home games at the G. B. Hodge Center in Spartanburg, South Carolina as members of the Big South Conference.

== Previous season ==
The Spartans finished the 2022–23 season 16–16, 10–8 in Big South play, to finish in a three-way tie for fourth place. In the first round of the Big South tournament, they defeated Gardner–Webb, before falling to top-seeded UNC Asheville in the semifinals. They were invited to participate in the CBI, where they were defeated by Indiana State in the first round.

== Roster ==
2023–24 USC Upstate Spartans men's basketball team
Players
Coaches

Pos.	#	Name	Height	Weight	Year	Hometown
G	0	Andrew McConnell	6 ft 2 in (1.88 m)	170 lb (77 kg)	RS So	Buford, GA
G/F	1	Nick Alves	6 ft 6 in (1.98 m)	185 lb (84 kg)	GS	Melbourne, FL
G	2	Justin Bailey	6 ft 3 in (1.91 m)	185 lb (84 kg)	So	Taylors, SC
G	3	Eduardo Placer	6 ft 5 in (1.96 m)	205 lb (93 kg)	Fr	Orlando, FL
G	4	Jalen Breazeale	5 ft 11 in (1.8 m)	160 lb (73 kg)	RS So	Roebuck, SC
F	5	Jordyn Surratt	6 ft 7 in (2.01 m)	200 lb (91 kg)	So	Spartanburg, SC
F	10	Jacquez Dash	6 ft 7 in (2.01 m)	205 lb (93 kg)	Fr	Summerville, SC
F	11	Patrick Iriel	6 ft 10 in (2.08 m)	230 lb (104 kg)	Jr	Columbia, SC
G	12	Trae Broadnax	6 ft 4 in (1.93 m)	200 lb (91 kg)	RS Jr	Savannah, GA
G	14	Floyd Jr. Rideau	6 ft 5 in (1.96 m)	170 lb (77 kg)	RS Jr	Lake Wales, FL
G	15	Jorge Ochoa	6 ft 7 in (2.01 m)	225 lb (102 kg)	So	Los Angeles, CA
G	21	CJ Rich	5 ft 10 in (1.78 m)	155 lb (70 kg)	Fr	Columbia, SC
G	22	Thomas Sheida	6 ft 2 in (1.88 m)	180 lb (82 kg)	RS Sr	Bundaberg, Australia
F	23	Dave III Dickerson	6 ft 6 in (1.98 m)	218 lb (99 kg)	RS Sr	Inman, SC
G	34	Miguel Ayesa	6 ft 5 in (1.96 m)	210 lb (95 kg)	GS	Madrid, Spain
F	35	Ahmir Langlais	6 ft 9 in (2.06 m)	225 lb (102 kg)	RS Sr	Atlanta, GA

Head coach

- Dave Dickerson (Maryland)

Assistant coach(es)

- Andrew Garcia (Tulane)
- Chris Logsdon (Wooster)
- Nori Johnson (College of Charleston)

Legend

- (C) Team captain
- (S) Suspended
- (I) Ineligible
- (W) Walk-on
- Injured
- Current redshirt

Roster
Last update: October 22, 2023

== Schedule and results ==
Date time, TV	Rank^{#}	Opponent^{#}	Result	Record	Site (attendance) city, state
Non-conference regular season
November 6, 2023*; 7:00 p.m., ESPN+/SECN+		at South Carolina	L 53–82	0–1	Colonial Life Arena (11,216); Columbia, SC
November 10, 2023*; 7:00 p.m., ESPN+/SECN+		at Vanderbilt	L 67–74	0–2	Memorial Gymnasium (5,346); Nashville, TN
November 12, 2023*; 4:00 p.m., ESPN+		Carolina	W 106–48	1–2	G. B. Hodge Center (414); Spartanburg, SC
November 15, 2023*; 7:00 p.m., ESPN+		at East Carolina	W 83–81	2–2	Williams Arena (4,585); Greenville, NC
November 18, 2023*; 2:00 p.m., Peacock		at Minnesota	L 53–67	2–3	Williams Arena (7,347); Minneapolis, MN
November 21, 2023*; 7:00 p.m., ESPN+		at Ball State	L 58–75	2–4	Worthen Arena (3,018); Muncie, IN
November 25, 2023*; 4:00 p.m., ESPN+		Voorhees	W 79–44	3–4	G. B. Hodge Center (243); Spartanburg, SC
November 29, 2023*; 7:00 p.m., ESPN+		at Coastal Carolina	L 70–72 ^{OT}	3–5	HTC Center (1,244); Conway, SC
December 2, 2023*; 3:00 p.m.		at North Carolina Central	W 85–82	4–5	McDougald–McLendon Arena (1,017); Durham, NC
December 9, 2023*; 7:00 p.m., ESPN+		Kennesaw State	L 77–84	4–6	G. B. Hodge Center (472); Spartanburg, SC
December 16, 2023*; 4:30 p.m., ESPN+		Western Carolina	L 53–70	4–7	G. B. Hodge Center (414); Spartanburg, SC
December 21, 2023*; 7:00 p.m., ESPN+		at Davidson	L 59–62	4–8	John M. Belk Arena (2,839); Davidson, NC
December 30, 2023*; 4:00 p.m., ESPN+		Coker	W 96–76	5–8	G. B. Hodge Center (359); Spartanburg, SC
Big South Conference regular season
January 3, 2024; 6:30 p.m., ESPN+		at UNC Asheville; Ingles I-26 Rivalry	L 67–95	5–9 (0–1)	Kimmel Arena (970); Asheville, NC
January 6, 2024; 4:00 p.m., ESPN+		Winthrop	L 80–82 ^{OT}	5–10 (0–2)	G. B. Hodge Center (508); Spartanburg, SC
January 13, 2024; 5:30 p.m., ESPN+		at Charleston Southern	L 70–77	5–11 (0–3)	Buccaneer Field House (498); North Charleston, SC
January 17, 2024; 7:00 p.m., ESPN+		Longwood	W 73–71	6–11 (1–3)	G. B. Hodge Center (596); Spartanburg, SC
January 20, 2024; 2:00 p.m., ESPN+		at Radford	L 61–64	6–12 (1–4)	Dedmon Center (1,331); Radford, VA
January 24, 2024; 7:00 p.m., ESPN+		High Point	L 67–78	6–13 (1–5)	G. B. Hodge Center (674); Spartanburg, SC
January 27, 2024; 4:00 p.m., ESPN+		at Gardner–Webb	L 70–75	6–14 (1–6)	Paul Porter Arena (904); Boiling Springs, NC
January 31, 2024; 7:00 p.m., ESPN+		at Presbyterian	L 73–80	6–15 (1–7)	Templeton Physical Education Center (298); Clinton, SC
February 3, 2024; 4:00 p.m., ESPN+		Radford	W 78–69	7–15 (2–7)	G. B. Hodge Center (495); Spartanburg, SC
February 7, 2024; 7:00 p.m., ESPN+		at Longwood	W 69–64	8–15 (3–7)	Joan Perry Brock Center (1,326); Farmville, VA
February 10, 2024; 4:00 p.m., ESPN+		UNC Asheville; Ingles I-26 Rivalry	L 64–77	8–16 (3–8)	G. B. Hodge Center (488); Spartanburg, SC
February 14, 2024; 7:00 p.m., ESPN+		at High Point	W 86–81 ^{OT}	9–16 (4–8)	Qubein Center (2,895); High Point, NC
February 17, 2024; 4:30 p.m., ESPN+		Gardner–Webb	L 65–73	9–17 (4–9)	G. B. Hodge Center (580); Spartanburg, SC
February 21, 2024; 7:00 p.m., ESPN+		Charleston Southern	L 60–63	9–18 (4–10)	G. B. Hodge Center (395); Spartanburg, SC
February 24, 2024; 2:00 p.m., ESPN+		at Winthrop	L 74–83	9–19 (4–11)	Winthrop Coliseum (2,225); Rock Hill, SC
February 28, 2024; 7:00 p.m., ESPN+		Presbyterian	W 74–72	10–19 (5–11)	G. B. Hodge Center (576); Spartanburg, SC
Big South tournament
March 6, 2024; 8:00 p.m., ESPN+	(8)	vs. (9) Radford; First round	L 60–67	10–20	Qubein Center; High Point, NC
*Non-conference game. ^{#}Rankings from AP poll. (#) Tournament seedings in parentheses. All times are in Eastern.
