= 2023–24 Winthrop Eagles men's basketball team =

American college basketball season

2023–24 Winthrop Eagles men's basketball
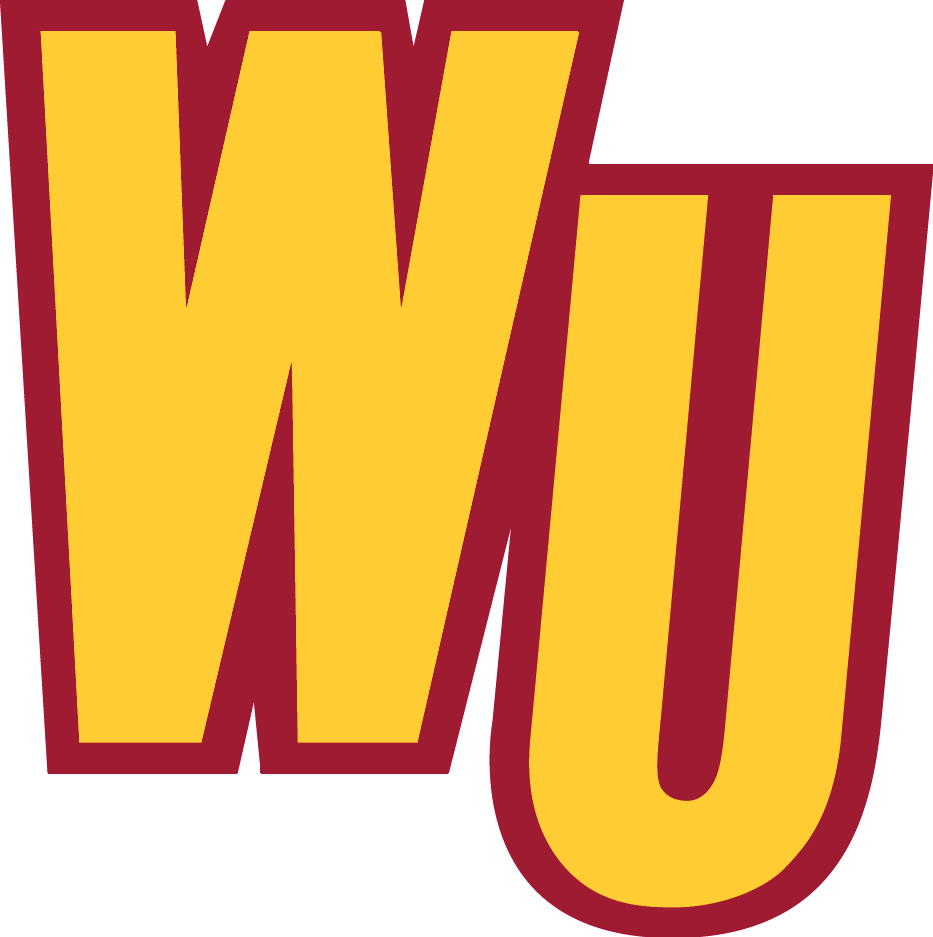
- Conference: Big South Conference
- Record: 17–15 (8–8 Big South)
- Head coach: Mark Prosser (3rd season)
- Assistant coaches: Tony Rack; Ben Betts; Mitchell Hill
- Home arena: Winthrop Coliseum

2023–24 Big South men's basketball standings
	Conf.				Overall
Team	W		L	PCT	W		L	PCT
High Point	13	–	3	.813	27	–	9	.750
UNC Asheville	12	–	4	.750	22	–	12	.647
Gardner–Webb	11	–	5	.688	17	–	16	.515
Winthrop	8	–	8	.500	17	–	15	.531
Longwood †	6	–	10	.375	21	–	14	.600
Presbyterian	6	–	10	.375	14	–	19	.424
Charleston Southern	6	–	10	.375	10	–	20	.333
USC Upstate	5	–	11	.313	10	–	20	.333
Radford	5	–	11	.313	16	–	17	.485
† 2024 Big South tournament winner

The 2023–24 Winthrop Eagles men's basketball team represented Winthrop University during the 2023–24 NCAA Division I men's basketball season. The Eagles, led by third-year head coach Mark Prosser, played their home games at the Winthrop Coliseum in Rock Hill, South Carolina as members of the Big South Conference. They finished the season 17–15, 8–8 in Big South play, to finish in fourth place.

== Previous season ==
The Eagles finished the 2022–23 season 15–17, 10–8 in Big South play, to finish in a three-way tie for sixth place. They were defeated by Radford in the first round of the Big South tournament.

== Roster ==
2023–24 Winthrop Eagles men's basketball team
Players
Coaches

Pos.	#	Name	Height	Weight	Year	Hometown
G	0	Sin'Cere McMahon	6 ft 1 in (1.85 m)	167 lb (76 kg)	Sr	Indianapolis, IN
G	1	Isaiah Wilson	6 ft 1 in (1.85 m)	170 lb (77 kg)	Sr	Pittsburgh, PA
G	2	Xavier McKelvy	6 ft 2 in (1.88 m)	180 lb (82 kg)	So	Charlotte, NC
G	3	Micheal Anumba	6 ft 4 in (1.93 m)	220 lb (100 kg)	GS	Reggio Emilia, Italy
F	4	Kelton Talford	6 ft 7 in (2.01 m)	195 lb (88 kg)	Sr	Great Falls, SC
F	5	Yoro Diallo	6 ft 8 in (2.03 m)	200 lb (91 kg)	RS Fr	Cincinnati, OH
G	10	Nick Johnson	6 ft 4 in (1.93 m)	230 lb (104 kg)	Sr	The Bronx, NY
G	11	Kasen Harrison	6 ft 2 in (1.88 m)	190 lb (86 kg)	Sr	Beaumont, TX
F	12	K.J. Doucet	6 ft 7 in (2.01 m)	230 lb (104 kg)	Jr	Austell, GA
G	13	Clay Howard	6 ft 3 in (1.91 m)	180 lb (82 kg)	So	Aiken, SC
G	14	Noah Van Bibber	6 ft 5 in (1.96 m)	185 lb (84 kg)	Fr	DeBary, FL
G	21	Henry Harrison	5 ft 11 in (1.8 m)	175 lb (79 kg)	Fr	Lewisburg, PA
F	23	Michael Moore	6 ft 10 in (2.08 m)	220 lb (100 kg)	So	Hermitage, PA
F	33	Chase Claxton	6 ft 7 in (2.01 m)	185 lb (84 kg)	GS	Greenville, SC
C	40	Alex Timmerman	6 ft 10 in (2.08 m)	270 lb (122 kg)	GS	Crystal Lake, IL
G	55	Cam Christy	6 ft 4 in (1.93 m)	200 lb (91 kg)	So	Walton, KY

Head coach

- Mark Prosser (Marist)

Assistant coach(es)

- Tony Rack (Northern Kentucky)
- Ben Betts (Roanoke)
- Mitchell Hill (Tennessee Tech)

Legend

- (C) Team captain
- (S) Suspended
- (I) Ineligible
- (W) Walk-on
- Injured
- Current redshirt

Roster
Last update: November 7, 2023

== Schedule and results ==
Date time, TV	Rank^{#}	Opponent^{#}	Result	Record	Site (attendance) city, state
Non-conference regular season
November 6, 2023*; 7:00 p.m., ACCNX/ESPN+		at Clemson	L 56–78	0–1	Littlejohn Coliseum (6,361); Clemson, SC
November 8, 2023*; 6:30 p.m., ESPN+		Brevard	W 98–44	1–1	Winthrop Coliseum (1,002); Rock Hill, SC
November 11, 2023*; 5:30 p.m., ESPN+		Drexel	L 72–74	1–2	Winthrop Coliseum (2,501); Rock Hill, SC
November 17, 2023*; 5:00 p.m., ESPN+		vs. Holy Cross; Winthrop Invitational	W 89–51	2–2	Rock Hill Sports & Event Center (909); Rock Hill, SC
November 18, 2023*; 5:00 p.m., ESPN+		vs. IUPUI; Winthrop Invitational	W 74–61	3–2	Rock Hill Sports & Event Center (711); Rock Hill, SC
November 19, 2023*; 2:30 p.m., ESPN+		vs. Elon; Winthrop Invitational	W 78–70	4–2	Rock Hill Sports & Event Center (944); Rock Hill, SC
November 24, 2023*; 5:00 p.m., ESPN+/SECN+		at Georgia	L 69–78	4–3	Stegeman Coliseum (6,046); Athens, GA
November 28, 2023*; 6:30 p.m., ESPN+		Bob Jones	W 90–49	5–3	Winthrop Coliseum (860); Rock Hill, SC
December 2, 2023*; 3:30 p.m., ESPN+		at Coastal Carolina	W 90–87	6–3	HTC Center (1,305); Conway, SC
December 5, 2023*; 6:30 p.m., ESPN+		Queens	W 88–82	7–3	Winthrop Coliseum (1,279); Rock Hill, SC
December 10, 2023*; 1:00 p.m., ESPN+		at Little Rock	W 85–68	8–3	Jack Stephens Center (387); Little Rock, AR
December 16, 2023*; 7:30 p.m., FS1		at Xavier	L 59–75	8–4	Cintas Center (10,224); Cincinnati, OH
December 19, 2023*; 7:00 p.m., ESPN+/SECN+		at South Carolina	L 62–72	8–5	Colonial Life Arena (9,455); Columbia, SC
December 22, 2023*; 7:00 p.m., ESPN+/ACCNX		at Florida State	L 61–67	8–6	Donald L. Tucker Civic Center (4,499); Tallahassee, FL
December 29, 2023*; 4:00 p.m., ESPN+		Toccoa Falls	W 113–62	9–6	Winthrop Coliseum (1,362); Rock Hill, SC
Big South Conference regular season
January 3, 2024; 6:30 p.m., ESPN+		Longwood	W 68–60 ^{OT}	10–6 (1–0)	Winthrop Coliseum (1,426); Rock Hill, SC
January 6, 2024; 4:00 p.m., ESPN+		at USC Upstate	W 82–80 ^{OT}	11–6 (2–0)	G. B. Hodge Center (508); Spartanburg, SC
January 10, 2024; 7:00 p.m., ESPN+		at Presbyterian	W 81–71	12–6 (3–0)	Templeton Physical Education Center (644); Clinton, SC
January 13, 2024; 2:00 p.m., ESPN+		Radford	W 92–88 ^{3OT}	13–6 (4–0)	Winthrop Coliseum (2,092); Rock Hill, SC
January 18, 2024; 7:00 p.m., ESPNU		UNC Asheville	L 77–82	13–7 (4–1)	Winthrop Coliseum (2,831); Rock Hill, SC
January 20, 2024; 1:00 p.m., ESPN+		at Gardner–Webb	L 74–79	13–8 (4–2)	Paul Porter Arena (702); Boiling Springs, NC
January 24, 2024; 7:00 p.m., ESPN+		at Charleston Southern	W 78–59	14–8 (5–2)	Buccaneer Field House (812); North Charleston, SC
January 27, 2024; 4:00 p.m., ESPN+		High Point	L 81–83	14–9 (5–3)	Winthrop Coliseum (2,440); Rock Hill, SC
February 3, 2024; 2:00 p.m., ESPN+		at UNC Asheville	L 78–82	14–10 (5–4)	Kimmel Arena (2,206); Asheville, NC
February 7, 2024; 6:30 p.m., ESPN+		Charleston Southern	W 67–46	15–10 (6–4)	Winthrop Coliseum (1,894); Rock Hill, SC
February 10, 2024; 3:00 p.m., ESPN+		at Longwood	L 74–84	15–11 (6–5)	Joan Perry Brock Center (2,873); Farmville, VA
February 15, 2024; 8:00 p.m., ESPN+		at Radford	W 85–69	16–11 (7–5)	Dedmon Center (1,404); Radford, VA
February 21, 2024; 6:30 p.m., ESPN+		Presbyterian	L 55–78	16–12 (7–6)	Winthrop Coliseum (2,272); Rock Hill, SC
February 24, 2024; 2:00 p.m., ESPN+		USC Upstate	W 83–74	17–12 (8–6)	Winthrop Coliseum (2,225); Rock Hill, SC
February 28, 2024; 7:00 p.m., ESPN+		at High Point	L 96–100 ^{OT}	17–13 (8–7)	Qubein Center (3,584); High Point, NC
March 2, 2024; 2:00 p.m., ESPN+		Gardner–Webb	L 64–65	17–14 (8–8)	Winthrop Coliseum (2,443); Rock Hill, SC
Big South tournament
March 8, 2024; 2:00 p.m., ESPN+	(4)	vs. (5) Longwood; Quarterfinals	L 56–69	17–15	Qubein Center (4,258); High Point, NC
*Non-conference game. ^{#}Rankings from AP poll. (#) Tournament seedings in parentheses. All times are in Eastern.
