= 2023–24 Charleston Southern Buccaneers men's basketball team =

American college basketball season

2023–24 Charleston Southern Buccaneers men's basketball
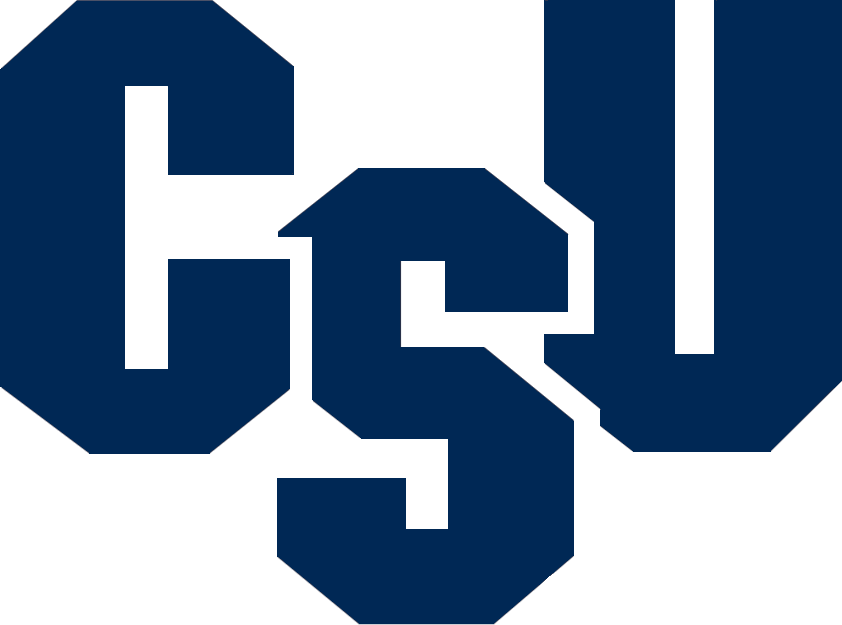
- Conference: Big South Conference
- Record: 10–20 (6–10 Big South)
- Head coach: Barclay Radebaugh (19th season; first 7 games); Saah Nimley (interim, rest of season)
- Assistant coaches: Anthony White Jr.; Nate Louis
- Home arena: Buccaneer Field House

2023–24 Big South men's basketball standings
	Conf.				Overall
Team	W		L	PCT	W		L	PCT
High Point	13	–	3	.813	27	–	9	.750
UNC Asheville	12	–	4	.750	22	–	12	.647
Gardner–Webb	11	–	5	.688	17	–	16	.515
Winthrop	8	–	8	.500	17	–	15	.531
Longwood †	6	–	10	.375	21	–	14	.600
Presbyterian	6	–	10	.375	14	–	19	.424
Charleston Southern	6	–	10	.375	10	–	20	.333
USC Upstate	5	–	11	.313	10	–	20	.333
Radford	5	–	11	.313	16	–	17	.485
† 2024 Big South tournament winner

The 2023–24 Charleston Southern Buccaneers men's basketball team represented Charleston Southern University during the 2023–24 NCAA Division I men's basketball season. The Buccaneers were led by 19th-year head coach Barclay Radebaugh for the first 7 games of the season before he resigned on November 30, 2023 with assistant Saah Nimley taking over for the rest of the season. They played their home games at the Buccaneer Field House in North Charleston, South Carolina as members of the Big South Conference.

== Previous season ==
The Buccaneers finished the 2022–23 season 10–21, 5–13 in Big South play to finish in ninth place. They defeated High Point in the first round of the Big South tournament, before falling to top-seeded and eventual champions UNC Asheville in the quarterfinals.

== Roster ==
2023–24 Charleston Southern Buccaneers men's basketball team
Players
Coaches

Pos.	#	Name	Height	Weight	Year	Hometown
G	0	Gaddis Heath III	6 ft 4 in (1.93 m)	187 lb (85 kg)	So	Atlanta, Georgia
F	1	Kalib Clinton	6 ft 6 in (1.98 m)	207 lb (94 kg)	Jr	Jefferson, Georgia
F	2	Taje' Kelly	6 ft 7 in (2.01 m)	253 lb (115 kg)	Jr	Atlanta, Georgia
G	4	Daren Patrick	6 ft 6 in (1.98 m)	200 lb (91 kg)	RS Jr	Powder Springs, Georgia
G	10	Jaiden Thompson	6 ft 0 in (1.83 m)	170 lb (77 kg)	Fr	Concord, North Carolina
G	11	A'lahn Sumler	6 ft 4 in (1.93 m)	185 lb (84 kg)	So	Waterbury, Connecticut
F	13	Reginald Duhart Jr.	6 ft 9 in (2.06 m)	210 lb (95 kg)	RS Sr	Boynton Beach, Florida
F	14	Nobal Days	6 ft 9 in (2.06 m)	225 lb (102 kg)	GS	Racine, Wisconsin
F	15	Jarell Caviness	6 ft 5 in (1.96 m)	200 lb (91 kg)	Fr	New York, New York
G	20	Aden Haas	6 ft 5 in (1.96 m)	195 lb (88 kg)	Fr	Centennial, Colorado
G	21	Amarion Savage	6 ft 0 in (1.83 m)	170 lb (77 kg)	RS Fr	Aurora, Illinois
G	22	RJ Johnson	6 ft 1 in (1.85 m)	185 lb (84 kg)	RS So	Matthews, North Carolina
G	24	Louis Hutchinson	6 ft 7 in (2.01 m)	190 lb (86 kg)	So	Upper Marlboro, Maryland
F	33	Quentin Bolton Jr.	6 ft 6 in (1.98 m)	220 lb (100 kg)	So	Racine, Wisconsin
F	34	Lase Olalere	6 ft 10 in (2.08 m)	230 lb (104 kg)	Fr	Charleston, South Carolina
G	55	Tres Berry	6 ft 4 in (1.93 m)	183 lb (83 kg)	RS Jr	Cleveland, Tennessee

Head coach

- Barclay Radebaugh (East Tennessee State)

Assistant coach(es)

- Saah Nimley (Charleston Southern)
- Anthony White Jr. (Mercer)
- Nate Louis (Charleston Southern)

Legend

- (C) Team captain
- (S) Suspended
- (I) Ineligible
- (W) Walk-on
- Injured
- Current redshirt

Roster
Last update: October 28, 2023

== Schedule and results ==
Date time, TV	Rank^{#}	Opponent^{#}	Result	Record	Site (attendance) city, state
Non-conference regular season
November 6, 2023*; 7:00 pm, ESPN+		Toccoa Falls	W 94–59	1–0	Buccaneer Field House (721); North Charleston, SC
November 9, 2023*; 7:00 pm, ESPN+		North Florida	L 70–81	1–1	Buccaneer Field House (587); North Charleston, SC
November 13, 2023*; 7:00 pm, ESPN+		Johnson & Wales (NC)	W 102–61	2–1	Buccaneer Field House (573); North Charleston, SC
November 17, 2023*; 7:00 pm, ACCNX		at NC State	L 53–87	2–2	PNC Arena (12,331); Raleigh, NC
November 20, 2023*; 7:00 pm		at Bethune–Cookman	L 73–79	2–3	Moore Gymnasium (671); Daytona Beach, FL
November 24, 2023*; 1:00 pm, ACCNX		at Wake Forest	L 56–71	2–4	LJVM Coliseum (6,702); Winston-Salem, NC
November 28, 2023*; 7:00 pm, ESPN+		at The Citadel	L 52–81	2–5	McAlister Field House (1,527); Charleston, SC
December 2, 2023*; 5:30 pm, ESPN+		South Carolina State	W 66–64	3–5	Buccaneer Field House (767); North Charleston, SC
December 13, 2023*; 7:00 pm, ESPN+		North Alabama	L 64–76	3–6	Buccaneer Field House (562); North Charleston, SC
December 16, 2023*; 6:00 pm, SECN+		at South Carolina	L 69–73	3–7	Colonial Life Arena (10,006); Columbia, SC
December 19, 2023*; 8:00 pm, ESPN+		at Loyola–Chicago	L 59–72	3–8	Joseph J. Gentile Arena (2,004); Chicago, IL
December 21, 2023*; 3:00 pm, ESPN+		Kentucky Christian	W 103–79	4–8	Buccaneer Field House (156); North Charleston, SC
December 29, 2023*; 8:00 pm, ACCN		at No. 9 North Carolina	L 60–105	4–9	Dean Smith Center (21,750); Chapel Hill, NC
Big South Conference regular season
January 3, 2024; 7:00 pm, ESPN+		Presbyterian	L 61–68	4–10 (0–1)	Buccaneer Field House (587); North Charleston, SC
January 6, 2024; 3:00 pm, ESPN+		at Longwood	L 56–77	4–11 (0–2)	Joan Perry Brock Center (1,423); Farmville, VA
January 10, 2024; 7:00 pm, ESPN+		at Gardner–Webb	W 86–74	5–11 (1–2)	Paul Porter Arena (604); Boiling Springs, NC
January 13, 2024; 5:30 pm, ESPN+		USC Upstate	W 77–70	6–11 (2–2)	Buccaneer Field House (498); North Charleston, SC
January 20, 2024; 7:00 pm, ESPN+		at High Point	L 79–86	6–12 (2–3)	Qubein Center (4,768); High Point, NC
January 24, 2024; 7:00 pm, ESPN+		Winthrop	L 59–78	6–13 (2–4)	Buccaneer Field House (812); North Charleston, SC
January 27, 2024; 5:30 pm, ESPN+		UNC Asheville	L 65–71	6–14 (2–5)	Buccaneer Field House; North Charleston, SC
January 31, 2024; 7:00 pm, ESPN+		at Radford	W 63–60	7–14 (3–5)	Dedmon Center (1,332); Radford, VA
February 3, 2024; 5:30 pm, ESPN+		Longwood	W 83–77	8–14 (4–5)	Buccaneer Field House (612); North Charleston, SC
February 7, 2024; 6:30 pm, ESPN+		at Winthrop	L 46–67	8–15 (4–6)	Winthrop Coliseum (1,894); Rock Hill, SC
February 14, 2024; 7:00 pm, ESPN+		Gardner–Webb	L 77–85	8–16 (4–7)	Buccaneer Field House (401); North Charleston, SC
February 17, 2024; 4:30 pm, ESPN+		at UNC Asheville	L 55–86	8–17 (4–8)	Kimmel Arena (2,769); Asheville, NC
February 21, 2024; 7:00 pm, ESPN+		at USC Upstate	W 63–60	9–17 (5–8)	G. B. Hodge Center (395); Spartanburg, SC
February 24, 2024; 5:30 pm, ESPN+		High Point	L 59–74	9–18 (5–9)	Buccaneer Field House (658); North Charleston, SC
February 28, 2024; 7:00 pm, ESPN+		Radford	W 58–57	10–18 (6–9)	Buccaneer Field House (567); North Charleston, SC
March 2, 2024; 2:00 pm, ESPN+		at Presbyterian	L 65–72	10–19 (6–10)	Templeton Physical Education Center (444); Clinton, SC
Big South tournament
March 8, 2024; 6:00 pm, ESPN+	(7)	vs. (2) UNC Asheville; Quarterfinals	L 55–60	10–20	Qubein Center; High Point, NC
*Non-conference game. ^{#}Rankings from AP Poll. (#) Tournament seedings in parentheses. All times are in Eastern.
