= 2023–24 Gardner–Webb Runnin' Bulldogs men's basketball team =

Basketball team season

2023–24 Gardner–Webb Runnin' Bulldogs men's basketball
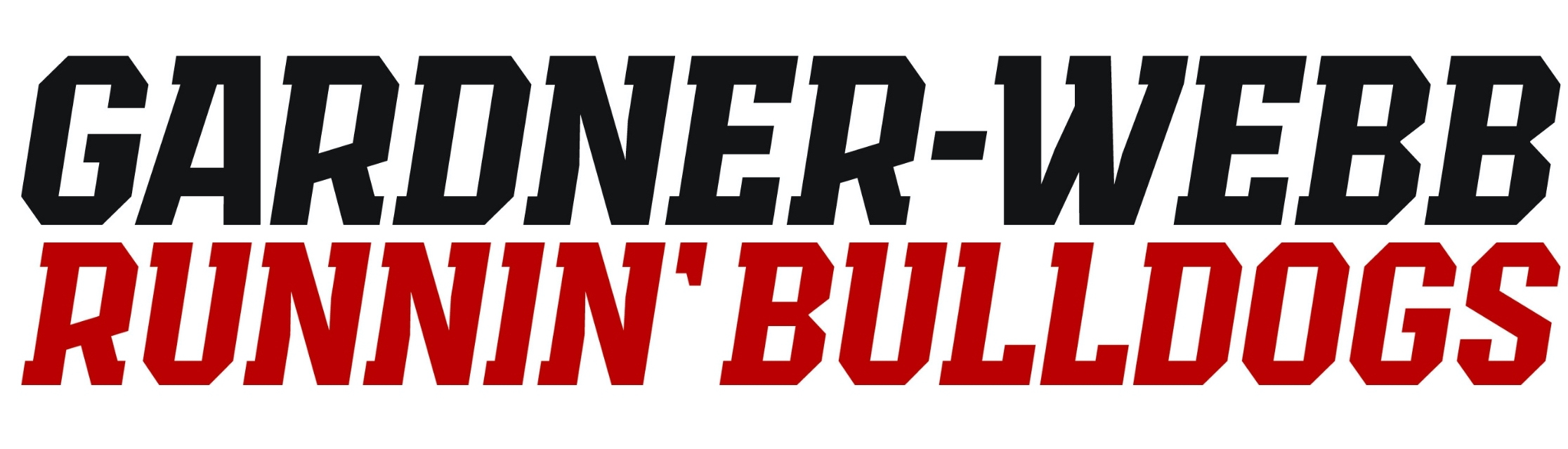
- Conference: Big South Conference
- Record: 17–16 (11–5 Big South)
- Head coach: Tim Craft (11th season)
- Associate head coach: Jeremy Luther
- Assistant coaches: Andrew Brown; Adam Bullard; Tannor Kraus
- Home arena: Paul Porter Arena

2023–24 Big South men's basketball standings
	Conf.				Overall
Team	W		L	PCT	W		L	PCT
High Point	13	–	3	.813	27	–	9	.750
UNC Asheville	12	–	4	.750	22	–	12	.647
Gardner–Webb	11	–	5	.688	17	–	16	.515
Winthrop	8	–	8	.500	17	–	15	.531
Longwood †	6	–	10	.375	21	–	14	.600
Presbyterian	6	–	10	.375	14	–	19	.424
Charleston Southern	6	–	10	.375	10	–	20	.333
USC Upstate	5	–	11	.313	10	–	20	.333
Radford	5	–	11	.313	16	–	17	.485
† 2024 Big South tournament winner

The 2023–24 Gardner–Webb Runnin' Bulldogs men's basketball team represented Gardner–Webb University during the 2023–24 NCAA Division I men's basketball season. The Runnin' Bulldogs, led by 11th-year head coach Tim Craft, played their home games at Paul Porter Arena in Boiling Springs, North Carolina as members of the Big South Conference. They finished the season 17–16, 11–5 in Big South play to finish in third place. They defeated Presbyterian in the quarterfinals of the Big South tournament before losing to UNC Asheville.

On March 13, 2024, Tim Craft left the team to become the head coach at Western Carolina.

== Previous season ==
The Runnin' Bulldogs finished the 2022–23 season 15–16, 10–8 in Big South play to finish in a three-way tie for fourth place. In the first round of the Big South Tournament, they were defeated by USC Upstate.

== Roster ==
2023–24 Gardner–Webb Runnin' Bulldogs men's basketball team
Players
Coaches

Pos.	#	Name	Height	Weight	Year	Hometown
G	0	Caleb Robinson	6 ft 4 in (1.93 m)	200 lb (91 kg)	Sr	Lake Arthur, Louisiana
G	1	Julien Soumaoro	5 ft 11 in (1.8 m)	175 lb (79 kg)	Jr	Bronx, New York
G	2	Brendan Mykalcio	6 ft 7 in (2.01 m)	208 lb (94 kg)	Jr	New City, New York
G	3	Quest Aldridge	6 ft 4 in (1.93 m)	185 lb (84 kg)	Sr	Winston-Salem, North Carolina
G	4	DQ Nicholas	6 ft 1 in (1.85 m)	180 lb (82 kg)	Sr	Atlanta, Georgia
F	5	Ademide Badmus	6 ft 7 in (2.01 m)	257 lb (117 kg)	Jr	Lynn, Massachusetts
G	6	Taku Youngblood	6 ft 2 in (1.88 m)	180 lb (82 kg)	So	Yokohama, Japan
F	7	Race Herr	6 ft 10 in (2.08 m)	200 lb (91 kg)	Fr	Odessa, Texas
G	8	Darryl "Buddy" Simmons II	5 ft 11 in (1.8 m)	160 lb (73 kg)	Fr	Detroit, Michigan
G	10	Chance Thacker	6 ft 4 in (1.93 m)	210 lb (95 kg)	So	Suwanee, Georgia
G	11	Deshawn Goodwyn	6 ft 5 in (1.96 m)	195 lb (88 kg)	So	Richmond, Virginia
G	13	Lucas Stieber	6 ft 3 in (1.91 m)	206 lb (93 kg)	Sr	Green Bay, Wisconsin
G	14	Shahar Lazar	6 ft 2 in (1.88 m)	215 lb (98 kg)	RS Fr	Emunim, Israel
F	15	Cheickna Sissoko	6 ft 9 in (2.06 m)	236 lb (107 kg)	Sr	Bamako, Mali
G	21	Paul Lindberg	6 ft 4 in (1.93 m)	195 lb (88 kg)	Fr	Houston, Texas
F	24	Isaiah Richards	6 ft 10 in (2.08 m)	225 lb (102 kg)	RS Jr	Brooklyn, New York
G	31	Anthony Phillips	6 ft 0 in (1.83 m)	160 lb (73 kg)	Sr	Charlotte, North Carolina
G	35	Isaiah Hicks	6 ft 0 in (1.83 m)	185 lb (84 kg)	RS Fr	Shelby, North Carolina

Head coach

- Tim Craft (Florida)

Assistant coach(es)

- Jeremy Luther (North Greenville)
- Andrew Brown (Mercer)
- Adam Bullard (Western Carolina)
- Tannor Kraus (Missouri)

Legend

- (C) Team captain
- (S) Suspended
- (I) Ineligible
- (W) Walk-on
- Injured
- Current redshirt

Roster
Last update: October 22, 2023

== Schedule and results ==
Date time, TV	Rank^{#}	Opponent^{#}	Result	Record	Site (attendance) city, state
Non-conference regular season
November 6, 2023*; 7:00 pm, ESPN+		Erskine	W 98–58	1–0	Paul Porter Arena (357); Boiling Springs, NC
November 10, 2023*; 8:00 pm, ESPN+/SECN+		at No. 14 Arkansas	L 68–86	1–1	Bud Walton Arena (19,200); Fayetteville, AR
November 12, 2023*; 5:00 pm, ESPN+		at No. 20 Baylor	L 62–77	1–2	Ferrell Center (8,037); Waco, TX
November 17, 2023*; 4:00 pm		vs. Weber State; Atlantic Slam	W 62–61	2–2	Avenir Centre (100); Moncton, NB
November 18, 2023*; 4:00 pm, ESPN+		vs. Colgate; Atlantic Slam	L 52–59	2–3	Avenir Centre; Moncton, NB
November 19, 2023*; 3:00 pm, ESPN+		vs. Yale; Atlantic Slam	L 70–71 ^{OT}	2–4	Avenir Centre; Moncton, NB
November 25, 2023*; 1:00 pm, ESPN+		Limestone	W 92–51	3–4	Paul Porter Arena (228); Boiling Springs, NC
November 29, 2023*; 5:00 p.m., ESPN+		at Queens	L 80–83	3–5	Curry Arena (381); Charlotte, NC
December 2, 2023*; 7:00 pm, ESPN+		Western Carolina	W 82–77	4–5	Paul Porter Arena (850); Boiling Springs, NC
December 6, 2023*; 7:00 pm, ESPN+		Wofford	L 66–81	4–6	Paul Porter Arena (250); Boiling Springs, NC
December 11, 2023*; 7:00 pm		North Greenville	W 79–60	5–6	Paul Porter Arena (265); Boiling Springs, NC
December 16, 2023*; 4:00 pm		vs. Appalachian State	L 59–80	5–7	Novant Health Fieldhouse (423); Greensboro, NC
December 19, 2023*; 7:00 pm, ESPN+		at Chattanooga	L 66–69	5–8	McKenzie Arena (3,026); Chattanooga, TN
December 21, 2023*; 7:00 pm, ESPN+		at Akron	L 90–94 ^{OT}	5–9	James A. Rhodes Arena; Akron, OH
December 30, 2023*; 2:00 pm, ESPN+		at VCU	L 73–87	5–10	Siegel Center (7,188); Richmond, VA
Big South Conference regular season
January 6, 2024; 2:00 pm, ESPN+		at High Point	L 76–85	5–11 (0–1)	Qubein Center (3,192); High Point, NC
January 10, 2024; 7:00 pm, ESPN+		Charleston Southern	L 74–86	5–12 (0–2)	Paul Porter Arena (604); Boiling Springs, NC
January 13, 2024; 1:00 pm, ESPN+		Presbyterian	W 76–60	6–12 (1–2)	Paul Porter Arena (406); Boiling Springs, NC
January 17, 2024; 7:00 pm, ESPN+		at Radford	W 74–68	7–12 (2–2)	Dedmon Center (1,615); Radford, VA
January 20, 2024; 1:00 pm, ESPN+		Winthrop	W 79–74	8–12 (3–2)	Paul Porter Arena (702); Boiling Springs, NC
January 24, 2024; 7:00 pm, ESPN+		at Longwood	W 76–64	9–12 (4–2)	Joan Perry Brock Center (1,345); Farmville, VA
January 27, 2024; 4:00 pm, ESPN+		USC Upstate	W 75–70	10–12 (5–2)	Paul Porter Arena (904); Boiling Springs, NC
January 31, 2024; 7:00 pm, ESPN+		UNC Asheville	W 80–73	11–12 (6–2)	Paul Porter Arena (719); Boiling Springs, NC
February 7, 2024; 7:00 pm, ESPN+		at Presbyterian	L 75–77	11–13 (6–3)	Templeton Physical Education Center (262); Clinton, SC
February 10, 2024; 1:00 pm, ESPN+		High Point	L 62–78	11–14 (6–4)	Paul Porter Arena (1,002); Boiling Springs, NC
February 14, 2024; 7:00 pm, ESPN+		at Charleston Southern	W 85–77	12–14 (7–4)	Buccaneer Field House (401); North Charleston, SC
February 17, 2024; 4:30 pm, ESPN+		at USC Upstate	W 73–65	13–14 (8–4)	G. B. Hodge Center (580); Spartanburg, SC
February 22, 2024; 7:00 pm, ESPNU		Radford	L 74–90	13–15 (8–5)	Paul Porter Arena (1,298); Boiling Springs, NC
February 24, 2024; 2:00 pm, ESPN+		at UNC Asheville	W 78–77	14–15 (9–5)	Kimmel Arena (3,129); Asheville, NC
February 29, 2024; 7:00 pm, ESPN+		Longwood	W 72–69	15–15 (10–5)	Paul Porter Arena (2,848); Boiling Springs, NC
March 2, 2024; 2:00 pm, ESPN+		at Winthrop	W 65–64	16–15 (11–5)	Winthrop Coliseum (2,443); Rock Hill, SC
Big South tournament
March 8, 2024; 8:00 pm, ESPN+	(3)	vs. (6) Presbyterian; Quarterfinals	W 61–60	17–15	Qubein Center; High Point, NC
March 9, 2024; 2:00 pm, ESPN+	(3)	vs. (2) UNC Asheville; Semifinals	L 72–83 ^{OT}	17–16	Qubein Center; High Point, NC
*Non-conference game. ^{#}Rankings from AP Poll. (#) Tournament seedings in parentheses. All times are in Eastern Time.
