= 2023–24 High Point Panthers men's basketball team =

American college basketball season

2023–24 High Point Panthers men's basketball

Big South regular season champions

CBI, Runner–up
- Conference: Big South Conference
- Record: 27–9 (13–3 Big South)
- Head coach: Alan Huss (1st season)
- Associate head coach: Flynn Clayman
- Assistant coaches: Mike Nesbitt; Corey Edwards; Trey Zeigler; Jaylen Stowe
- Home arena: Qubein Center

2023–24 Big South men's basketball standings
	Conf.				Overall
Team	W		L	PCT	W		L	PCT
High Point	13	–	3	.813	27	–	9	.750
UNC Asheville	12	–	4	.750	22	–	12	.647
Gardner–Webb	11	–	5	.688	17	–	16	.515
Winthrop	8	–	8	.500	17	–	15	.531
Longwood †	6	–	10	.375	21	–	14	.600
Presbyterian	6	–	10	.375	14	–	19	.424
Charleston Southern	6	–	10	.375	10	–	20	.333
USC Upstate	5	–	11	.313	10	–	20	.333
Radford	5	–	11	.313	16	–	17	.485
† 2024 Big South tournament winner

The 2023–24 High Point Panthers men's basketball team represented High Point University during the 2023–24 NCAA Division I men's basketball season. The Panthers, led by first-year head coach Alan Huss, played their home games at the Qubein Center in High Point, North Carolina as members of the Big South Conference.

== Previous season ==
The Panthers finished the 2022–23 season 14–17, 6–12 in Big South play, to finish in eighth place. They were defeated by Charleston Southern in the first round of the Big South tournament.

On March 3, 2023, the school fired head coach G. G. Smith after only one season at the helm. On March 27, the school named Creighton assistant coach Alan Huss as the team's new head coach.

== Roster ==
2023–24 High Point Panthers men's basketball team
Players
Coaches

Pos.	#	Name	Height	Weight	Year	Hometown
G	1	Kezza Giffa	6 ft 2 in (1.88 m)	165 lb (75 kg)	Fr	Paris, France
G	3	Trae Benham	6 ft 4 in (1.93 m)	205 lb (93 kg)	Jr	Concord, North Carolina
F	5	Kimani Hamilton	6 ft 7 in (2.01 m)	220 lb (100 kg)	So	Jackson, Mississippi
G	7	Titas Sargiunas	6 ft 4 in (1.93 m)	180 lb (82 kg)	Fr	Kaunas, Lithuania
G	8	Niko Limbert	6 ft 4 in (1.93 m)	185 lb (84 kg)	Fr	Simi Valley, California
F	10	Cade Potter	6 ft 8 in (2.03 m)	235 lb (107 kg)	So	Orange, California
G	11	Abdoulaye Thiam	6 ft 4 in (1.93 m)	185 lb (84 kg)	So	Orlando, Florida
G	12	Bryson Childress	5 ft 9 in (1.75 m)	165 lb (75 kg)	Sr	Albemarle, North Carolina
F	13	Liam McChesney	6 ft 10 in (2.08 m)	210 lb (95 kg)	GS	Prince Rupert, British Columbia
F	14	Pavlo Dziuba	6 ft 8 in (2.03 m)	240 lb (109 kg)	Jr	Kyiv, Ukraine
G	15	Justin Taylor	6 ft 2 in (1.88 m)	185 lb (84 kg)	So	Charlotte, North Carolina
G	16	Liam Carney	6 ft 6 in (1.98 m)	205 lb (93 kg)	So	Minneapolis, Minnesota
F	21	Juslin Bodo Bodo	7 ft 0 in (2.13 m)	240 lb (109 kg)	Fr	Yaoundé, Cameroon
F	22	Denzel Hines	6 ft 7 in (2.01 m)	205 lb (93 kg)	Fr	Fontana, California
G	23	Duke Miles	6 ft 3 in (1.91 m)	182 lb (83 kg)	Jr	Montgomery, Alabama
G	31	AJ Hoynack	6 ft 3 in (1.91 m)	200 lb (91 kg)	Sr	Miami, Florida
G	35	Camren Little	6 ft 3 in (1.91 m)	200 lb (91 kg)	Jr	Charlotte, North Carolina

Head coach

- Alan Huss (Creighton)

Assistant coach(es)

- Flynn Clayman (Troy)
- Mike Nesbitt (New Mexico)
- Corey Edwards (George Mason)
- Trey Zeigler (TCU)
- Jaylen Stowe (Mercer)

Legend

- (C) Team captain
- (S) Suspended
- (I) Ineligible
- (W) Walk-on
- Injured
- Current redshirt

Roster
Last update: November 6, 2023

== Schedule and results ==
Date time, TV	Rank^{#}	Opponent^{#}	Result	Record	Site (attendance) city, state
Exhibition
November 4, 2023*; 7:00 pm		Pfeiffer	W 113–90	–	Qubein Center (3,782); High Point, NC
Non-conference regular season
November 6, 2023*; 7:00 pm, ESPN+		St. Andrews	W 105–51	1–0	Qubein Center (2,366); High Point, NC
November 11, 2023*; 12:00 pm, ESPN+		at Wofford	L 98–99	1–1	Jerry Richardson Indoor Stadium (878); Spartanburg, SC
November 14, 2023*; 7:00 pm, ESPN+		at Queens	L 72–74	1–2	Curry Arena (873); Charlotte, NC
November 20, 2023*; 11:00 am, FloSports		vs. Iona; Gulf Coast Showcase first round	W 82–68	2–2	Hertz Arena (234); Estero, FL
November 21, 2023*; 5:00 pm, FloSports		vs. Illinois State; Gulf Coast Showcase semifinals	W 74–72	3–2	Hertz Arena (314); Estero, FL
November 22, 2023*; 7:30 pm, FloSports		vs. Hofstra; Gulf Coast Showcase Championship	L 92–97	3–3	Hertz Arena (413); Estero, FL
November 26, 2023*; 2:00 pm, ESPN+		Mount Olive	W 122–73	4–3	Qubein Center (1,437); High Point, NC
November 29, 2023*; 7:00 pm, ESPN+		Morgan State	W 77–59	5–3	Qubein Center (2,119); High Point, NC
December 2, 2023*; 2:00 pm, ESPN+		at North Florida	W 86–79	6–3	UNF Arena (1,289); Jacksonville, FL
December 5, 2023*; 7:00 pm, ESPN+		Western Carolina	W 97–71	7–3	Qubein Center (2,476); High Point, NC
December 8, 2023*; 7:00 pm, ESPN+		North Carolina A&T	W 75–62	8–3	Qubein Center (3,512); High Point, NC
December 16, 2023*; 5:30 pm, SECN+		at Georgia	L 58–66	8–4	Stegeman Coliseum (6,523); Athens, GA
December 19, 2023*; 7:00 pm, ESPN+		UNC Greensboro	W 74–63	9–4	Qubein Center (3,617); High Point, NC
December 22, 2023*; 7:00 pm, ESPN+		Canisius	W 78–70	10–4	Qubein Center (2,855); High Point, NC
December 30, 2023*; 7:00 pm, ESPN+		Bellarmine	W 90–85	11–4	Qubein Center (2,742); High Point, NC
Big South Conference regular season
January 3, 2024; 7:00 pm, ESPN+		at Radford	W 85–71	12–4 (1–0)	Dedmon Center (1,142); Radford, VA
January 6, 2024; 2:00 pm, ESPN+		Gardner–Webb	W 85–76	13–4 (2–0)	Qubein Center (3,192); High Point, NC
January 10, 2024; 7:00 pm, ESPN+		UNC Asheville	W 84–79	14–4 (3–0)	Qubein Center (4,069); High Point, NC
January 17, 2024; 7:00 pm, ESPN+		at Presbyterian	W 86–83	15–4 (4–0)	Templeton Physical Education Center (316); Clinton, SC
January 20, 2024; 7:00 pm, ESPN+		Charleston Southern	W 86–79	16–4 (5–0)	Qubein Center (4,768); High Point, NC
January 24, 2024; 7:00 pm, ESPN+		at USC Upstate	W 78–67	17–4 (6–0)	G. B. Hodge Center (674); Spartanburg, SC
January 27, 2024; 4:00 pm, ESPN+		at Winthrop	W 83–81	18–4 (7–0)	Winthrop Coliseum (2,440); Rock Hill, SC
February 1, 2024; 7:00 pm, ESPNU		Longwood	W 93–76	19–4 (8–0)	Qubein Center (5,349); High Point, NC
February 3, 2024; 7:00 pm, ESPN+		Presbyterian	W 78–68	20–4 (9–0)	Qubein Center (5,678); High Point, NC
February 7, 2024; 6:30 pm, ESPN+		at UNC Asheville	L 81–86	20–5 (9–1)	Kimmel Arena (2,529); Asheville, NC
February 10, 2024; 1:00 pm, ESPN+		at Gardner–Webb	W 78–62	21–5 (10–1)	Paul Porter Arena (1,002); Boiling Springs, NC
February 14, 2024; 7:00 pm, ESPN+		USC Upstate	L 81–86 ^{OT}	21–6 (10–2)	Qubein Center (2,895); High Point, NC
February 17, 2024; 7:00 pm, ESPN+		Radford	W 99–74	22–6 (11–2)	Qubein Center (4,935); High Point, NC
February 24, 2024; 5:30 pm, ESPN+		at Charleston Southern	W 74–59	23–6 (12–2)	Buccaneer Field House (658); North Charleston, SC
February 28, 2024; 7:00 pm, ESPN+		Winthrop	W 100–96 ^{OT}	24–6 (13–2)	Qubein Center (3,584); High Point, NC
March 2, 2024; 3:00 pm, ESPN+		at Longwood	L 72–74	24–7 (13–3)	Joan Perry Brock Center (2,753); Farmville, VA
Big South tournament
March 8, 2024; 12:00 pm, ESPN+	(1)	(9) Radford; Quarterfinals	W 77–63	25–7	Qubein Center (4,258); High Point, NC
March 9, 2024; 12:00 pm, ESPN+	(1)	(5) Longwood; Semifinals	L 79–80 ^{OT}	25–8	Qubein Center (4,438); High Point, NC
CBI
March 25, 2024; 12:00 pm, FloHoops	(1)	vs. (9) Cleveland State; Quarterfinals	W 93–74	26–8	Ocean Center; Daytona Beach, FL
March 26, 2024; 7:00 pm, ESPN2	(1)	vs. (4) Arkansas State; Semifinals	W 81–80	27–8	Ocean Center (N/A); Daytona Beach, FL
March 27, 2024; 5:00 pm, ESPN2	(1)	vs. (3) Seattle; Championship	L 67–77	27–9	Ocean Center (671); Daytona Beach, FL
*Non-conference game. ^{#}Rankings from AP poll. (#) Tournament seedings in parentheses. All times are in Eastern.
