= 2023–24 UNC Asheville Bulldogs men's basketball team =

American college basketball season

2023–24 UNC Asheville Bulldogs men's basketball
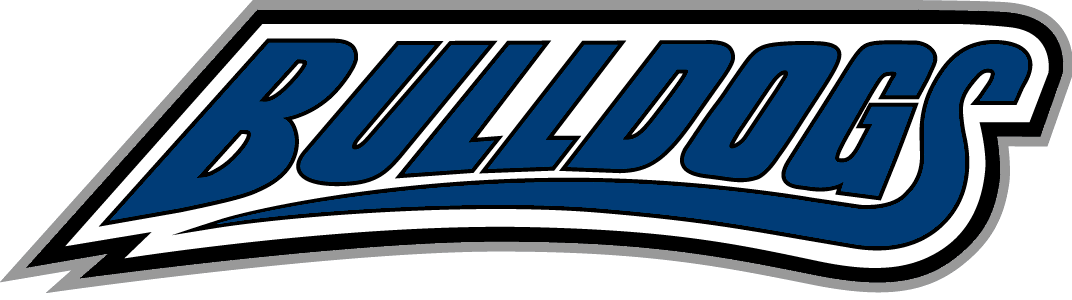
- Conference: Big South Conference
- Record: 22–12 (12–4 Big South)
- Head coach: Mike Morrell (6th season)
- Assistant coaches: Neil Dixon; Woody Taylor; Justin Levine
- Home arena: Kimmel Arena

2023–24 Big South men's basketball standings
	Conf.				Overall
Team	W		L	PCT	W		L	PCT
High Point	13	–	3	.813	27	–	9	.750
UNC Asheville	12	–	4	.750	22	–	12	.647
Gardner–Webb	11	–	5	.688	17	–	16	.515
Winthrop	8	–	8	.500	17	–	15	.531
Longwood †	6	–	10	.375	21	–	14	.600
Presbyterian	6	–	10	.375	14	–	19	.424
Charleston Southern	6	–	10	.375	10	–	20	.333
USC Upstate	5	–	11	.313	10	–	20	.333
Radford	5	–	11	.313	16	–	17	.485
† 2024 Big South tournament winner

The 2023–24 UNC Asheville Bulldogs men's basketball team represented the University of North Carolina at Asheville during the 2023–24 NCAA Division I men's basketball season. The Bulldogs, led by sixth-year head coach Mike Morrell, played their home games at Kimmel Arena in Asheville, North Carolina, as members of the Big South Conference.

== Previous season ==
The Bulldogs finished the 2022–23 season 27–8, 16–2 in Big South play to finish as Big South regular season champions. They defeated Charleston Southern, USC Upstate, and Campbell to win the Big South tournament and earned the conference's automatic bid into the NCAA tournament. In the NCAA tournament, they received the #15 seed in the West Region. In the first round, they lost to #2 region seed UCLA.

== Roster ==
2023–24 UNC Asheville Bulldogs men's basketball team
Players
Coaches

Pos.	#	Name	Height	Weight	Year	Hometown
G	0	Trent Stephney	6 ft 2 in (1.88 m)	173 lb (78 kg)	Sr	Knoxville, Tennessee
F	1	Jamon Battle	6 ft 5 in (1.96 m)	207 lb (94 kg)	Sr	Richmond, Virginia
G	2	Caleb Burgess	6 ft 3 in (1.91 m)	185 lb (84 kg)	Sr	Winston-Salem, North Carolina
G	3	Josh Banks	6 ft 5 in (1.96 m)	175 lb (79 kg)	Sr	Charlotte, North Carolina
F	4	Drew Pember	6 ft 11 in (2.11 m)	215 lb (98 kg)	Sr	Knoxville, Tennessee
G	5	Fletcher Abee	6 ft 4 in (1.93 m)	190 lb (86 kg)	Sr	Morganton, North Carolina
G	10	Davion Cunningham	6 ft 3 in (1.91 m)	165 lb (75 kg)	So	Charlotte, North Carolina
F	11	Greg Gantt Jr.	6 ft 8 in (2.03 m)	210 lb (95 kg)	RS Sr	Fayetteville, North Carolina
G	12	Evan Johnson	5 ft 11 in (1.8 m)	165 lb (75 kg)	Jr	Durham, North Carolina
F	13	Nick McMullen	6 ft 8 in (2.03 m)	237 lb (108 kg)	Sr	Greensboro, North Carolina
F	14	Toyaz Solomon	6 ft 9 in (2.06 m)	185 lb (84 kg)	Jr	Enfield, North Carolina
G	15	Dean Gabrelcik	6 ft 4 in (1.93 m)	213 lb (97 kg)	RS So	East Lake, Florida
G	22	Javoy Thompson	6 ft 7 in (2.01 m)	197 lb (89 kg)	Fr	Bronx, New York
G	24	Corey Jones	6 ft 2 in (1.88 m)	175 lb (79 kg)	Fr	Wake Forest, North Carolina
G	25	Rasheed Baldwin	6 ft 5 in (1.96 m)	190 lb (86 kg)	So	Charlotte, North Carolina

Head coach

- Mike Morrell (Milligan)

Assistant coach(es)

- Neil Dixon (West Virginia)
- Woody Taylor (Eckerd)
- Justin Levine (Ithaca)

Legend

- (C) Team captain
- (S) Suspended
- (I) Ineligible
- (W) Walk-on
- Injured
- Current redshirt

Roster
Last update: November 7, 2023

== Schedule and results ==
Date time, TV	Rank^{#}	Opponent^{#}	Result	Record	Site (attendance) city, state
Non-conference regular season
November 7, 2023*; 8:30 pm, B1G		at Michigan	L 74–99	0–1	Crisler Center (10,279); Ann Arbor, MI
November 11, 2023*; 2:00 pm, ESPN+		UNC Wilmington	L 66–83	0–2	Kimmel Arena (2,170); Asheville, NC
November 14, 2023*; 6:30 pm, ESPN+		Carolina	W 117–54	1–2	Kimmel Arena (614); Asheville, NC
November 18, 2023*; 2:00 pm, ESPN+		Virginia–Lynchburg	W 114–59	2–2	Kimmel Arena (998); Asheville, NC
November 24, 2023*; 2:00 pm		vs. Lipscomb; Northern Classic	L 75–86	2–3	Place Bell; Laval, QC
November 25, 2023*; 4:30 pm		vs. Wofford; Northern Classic	W 85–82 ^{OT}	3–3	Place Bell (100); Laval, QC
November 26, 2023*; 11:00 am		vs. Western Kentucky; Northern Classic	W 77–67	4–3	Place Bell; Laval, QC
December 1, 2023*; 6:30 pm, ESPN+		Johnson	W 97–51	5–3	Kimmel Arena (764); Asheville, NC
December 5, 2023*; 7:00 pm, ESPN+		at Kennesaw State	L 76–79 ^{OT}	5–4	KSU Convocation Center (1,230); Kennesaw, GA
December 9, 2023*; 4:00 pm, ESPN+		at Western Carolina	L 63–78	5–5	Ramsey Center (2,904); Cullowhee, NC
December 13, 2023*; 8:00 pm, ESPN+/SECN+		vs. Auburn; Rocket City Classic	L 62–87	5–6	Von Braun Center (6,556); Huntsville, AL
December 18, 2023*; 6:00 pm, ESPN+		South Carolina State	W 79–75	6–6	Kimmel Arena (1,028); Asheville, NC
December 21, 2023*; 7:00 pm, ESPN+		vs. Appalachian State; Hickory Hoops Classic	W 76–63	7–6	Tarlton Complex (1,825); Hickory, NC
December 23, 2023*; 2:00 pm, ESPN+/CW62		Kennesaw State	W 79–70	8–6	Kimmel Arena (1,579); Asheville, NC
December 29, 2023*; 8:00 pm, ESPN+		at UAB	L 85–90	8–7	Bartow Arena (3,392); Birmingham, AL
Big South Conference regular season
January 3, 2024; 6:00 pm, ESPN+/CW62		USC Upstate; Ingles I-26 Rivalry	W 95–67	9–7 (1–0)	Kimmel Arena (970); Asheville, NC
January 6, 2024; 2:00 pm, ESPN+		at Presbyterian	W 84–80	10–7 (2–0)	Templeton Physical Education Center (295); Clinton, SC
January 10, 2024; 7:00 pm, ESPN+		at High Point	L 79–84	10–8 (2–1)	Qubein Center (4,069); High Point, NC
January 13, 2024; 2:00 pm, ESPN+		Longwood	W 65–61	11–8 (3–1)	Kimmel Arena (1,577); Asheville, NC
January 18, 2024; 7:00 pm, ESPNU		at Winthrop	W 82–77	12–8 (4–1)	Winthrop Coliseum (2,831); Rock Hill, SC
January 24, 2024; 6:30 pm, ESPN+		Radford	W 81–69	13–8 (5–1)	Kimmel Arena (1,768); Asheville, NC
January 27, 2024; 4:30 pm, ESPN+		at Charleston Southern	W 71–65	14–8 (6–1)	Buccaneer Field House; North Charleston, SC
January 31, 2024; 7:00 pm, ESPN+		at Gardner–Webb	L 73–80	14–9 (6–2)	Paul Porter Arena (719); Boiling Springs, NC
February 3, 2024; 2:00 pm, ESPN+		Winthrop	W 82–78	15–9 (7–2)	Kimmel Arena (2,206); Asheville, NC
February 7, 2024; 6:30 pm, ESPN+		High Point	W 86–81	16–9 (8–2)	Kimmel Arena (2,529); Asheville, NC
February 10, 2024; 2:00 pm, ESPN+		at USC Upstate; Ingles I-26 Rivalry	W 77–64	17–9 (9–2)	G. B. Hodge Center (488); Spartanburg, SC
February 14, 2024; 6:30 pm, ESPN+		Presbyterian	W 71–69	18–9 (10–2)	Kimmel Arena (1,051); Asheville, NC
February 17, 2024; 4:30 pm, ESPN+		Charleston Southern	W 86–55	19–9 (11–2)	Kimmel Arena (2,769); Asheville, NC
February 21, 2024; 6:30 pm, ESPN+		at Longwood	L 75–80	19–10 (11–3)	Joan Perry Brock Center (2,547); Farmville, VA
February 24, 2024; 2:00 pm, ESPN+		Gardner–Webb	L 77–78	19–11 (11–4)	Kimmel Arena (3,129); Asheville, NC
March 2, 2024; 2:00 pm, ESPN+		at Radford	W 71–62	20–11 (12–4)	Dedmon Center (1,103); Radford, VA
Big South tournament
March 8, 2024; 6:00 pm, ESPN+	(2)	vs. (7) Charleston Southern; Quarterfinals	W 60–55	21–11	Qubein Center; High Point, NC
March 9, 2024; 2:00 pm, ESPN+	(2)	vs. (3) Gardner–Webb; Semifinals	W 83–72 ^{OT}	22–11	Qubein Center (4,438); High Point, NC
March 10, 2024; 12:00 pm, ESPN2	(2)	vs. (5) Longwood; Championship	L 59-85	22-12	Qubein Center (1,824); High Point, NC
*Non-conference game. ^{#}Rankings from AP Poll. (#) Tournament seedings in parentheses. All times are in Eastern.
