= 2024 Big South Conference men's basketball tournament =

American collegiate sporting event

- Classification: Division I
- Season: 2023–24
- Teams: 9
- Site: Qubein Center; High Point, North Carolina
- Champions: Longwood (2nd title)
- Winning coach: Griff Aldrich (2nd title)
- Attendance: 13,040 (total); 1,842 (championship)
- Television: ESPN+, ESPN2

2023–24 Big South men's basketball standings
	Conf.				Overall
Team	W		L	PCT	W		L	PCT
High Point	13	–	3	.813	27	–	9	.750
UNC Asheville	12	–	4	.750	22	–	12	.647
Gardner–Webb	11	–	5	.688	17	–	16	.515
Winthrop	8	–	8	.500	17	–	15	.531
Longwood †	6	–	10	.375	21	–	14	.600
Presbyterian	6	–	10	.375	14	–	19	.424
Charleston Southern	6	–	10	.375	10	–	20	.333
USC Upstate	5	–	11	.313	10	–	20	.333
Radford	5	–	11	.313	16	–	17	.485
† 2024 Big South tournament winner

The 2024 Big South men's basketball tournament was the postseason men's basketball tournament that ended the 2023–24 NCAA Division I men's basketball season of the Big South Conference. It was held from March 6–10 and played at the Qubein Center. The tournament winner, Longwood, received the automatic bid to the 2024 NCAA tournament.

== Seeds ==
All of the conference teams competed in the tournament. The top seven teams received a first-round bye. Teams were seeded by record within the conference, with a tiebreaker system to seed teams with identical conference records.

The tiebreakers operate in the following order:

1. Head-to-head record.
2. Record against the top-ranked conference team not involved in the tie, going down the standings until the tie is broken. For this purpose, teams with the same conference record are considered collectively. If two teams were unbeaten or winless against an opponent but did not play the same number of games against that opponent, the tie is not considered broken.

Seed	School	Conference	Overall	Tiebreaker
1	High Point	13–3	24–7	
2	UNC Asheville	12–4	20–11	
3	Gardner–Webb	11–5	16–15	
4	Winthrop	8–8	17–14	
5	Longwood	6–10	18–13	3–1 vs. Presbyterian/Charleston Southern
6	Presbyterian	6–10	14–17	2–2 vs. Longwood/Charleston Southern
7	Charleston Southern	6–10	10–19	1–3 vs. Longwood/Presbyterian
8	USC Upstate	5–11	15–16	1–1 vs. High Point
9	Radford	5–11	15–16	0–2 vs. High Point

== Schedule ==
Game	Time*	Matchup	Score	Channel	Attendance
Opening round - Wednesday, March 6
1	8:00 pm	No. 8 USC Upstate vs No. 9 Radford	60–67	ESPN+	978
Quarterfinals - Friday, March 8
2	12:00 pm	No. 1 High Point vs No. 9 Radford	77–63	ESPN+	4,258
3	2:00 pm	No. 4 Winthrop vs No. 5 Longwood	56–69	ESPN+	4,258
4	6:00 pm	No. 2 UNC Asheville vs. No. 7 Charleston Southern	60–55	ESPN+	1,524
5	8:00 pm	No. 3 Gardner–Webb vs No. 6 Presbyterian	61–60	ESPN+	1,524
Semifinals - Saturday, March 9
6	12:00 pm	No. 1 High Point vs No. 5 Longwood	79–80 ^{OT}	ESPN+	4,438
7	2:00 pm	No. 2 UNC Asheville vs No. 3 Gardner–Webb	83–72 ^{OT}	ESPN+	4,438
Championship - Sunday, March 10
8	12:00 pm	No. 5 Longwood vs No. 2 UNC Asheville	85–59	ESPN2	1,842
*Game times in ET

== Bracket ==
Opening round Wednesday, March 6 ESPN+
8	USC Upstate	60
9	Radford	67

Quarterfinals; Friday, March 8 ESPN+
1	High Point	77
9	Radford	63
4	Winthrop	56
5	Longwood	69
2	UNC Asheville	60
7	Charleston Southern	55
3	Gardner–Webb	61
6	Presbyterian	60

Semifinals; Saturday, March 9 ESPN+
1	High Point	79
5	Longwood	80*
2	UNC Asheville	83*
3	Gardner–Webb	72

Championship; Sunday, March 10; ESPN2
5	Longwood	85
2	UNC Asheville	59
