= Carolina Christian College =

Coordinates: 36.1462°N 80.2564°W

- Winston-Salem, NC

Information
- Former names: The Christian Institute, Winston-Salem Bible College
- Type: Private
- Motto: “Preparing real people for real ministry in a real world.”
- Established: 1945
- Founder: Dr. R. L. Peters and J. W. West
- President: LaTanya Tyson, PhD.
- Website: https://carolina.edu/

Carolina Christian College (CCC) is a special purpose, undergraduate institution. CCC educates persons for Christian ministries through a program of Biblical and theological studies, general education in the arts and sciences, and professional studies. Emphasis is placed upon cultural awareness and urban ministry that will prepare workers to establish and serve the church in the United States and around the world.

== Programs ==
CCC offers certificate, undergraduate, and graduate level ministry programs. The degree programs offered at CCC are:

- Certificate in Biblical Studies
- Bachelor of Arts in Ministry (A.C.E./A.S.A.P.)
- Master of Religious Education (A.M.P)
- Doctor of Ministry

Several undergraduate minors are offered in addition to the Bachelor of Arts in Ministry. They include:

- Leadership
- Christian Counseling
- Biblical Studies
- Homiletics
- Nonprofit Leadership
