= Longwood Lancers men's basketball =

Men's college basketball team

2025–26 Longwood Lancers men's basketball team
- University: Longwood University
- First season: 1976–77
- Head coach: Ronnie Thomas (1st season)
- Location: Farmville, Virginia
- Arena: Joan Perry Brock Center (capacity: 3,000)
- Conference: Big South
- Nickname: Lancers
- Colors: Blue and white
- Student section: Lancer Lunatics
- All-time record: 665–762 (.466)

NCAA Division I tournament Final Four
- Division III: 1980
Other NCAA Division I tournament results
Elite Eight	Division III: 1980
Sweet Sixteen	Division II: 1994; Division III: 1980
Appearances	Division I: 2022, 2024; Division II: 1994, 1995, 2001; Division III: 1980

Conference tournament champions
- CVAC: 2001; Big South: 2022, 2024

Conference regular-season champions
- Mason–Dixon: 1988; Big South: 2022

Conference division champions
- 2022

Uniforms
Home	Away	Alternate

The Longwood Lancers men's basketball team is the Division I basketball team that represents Longwood University in Farmville, Virginia. Since 2012, the team has competed in the Big South Conference of the National Collegiate Athletic Association. Their current head coach is Ronnie Thomas. The Lancers made their first appearance in the NCAA tournament in 2022, followed by another appearance in 2024.

== History ==
Longwood was an all-female school for the majority of its history; however, a limited number of male day students attended the school following World War II, and those students fielded a basketball team under the name Longwood Pioneers. The current NCAA men's basketball program began in 1976 under head coach Allan McNamee, when the school became fully co-educational that same year. The Lancers finished 1–6 against four year institutions in the inaugural season, and 2–9 overall. The Lancers were NCAA Division III members for their first four years. In 1980, they became Division II members, until 2004, when they began a transition to Division I membership. They became full Division I members in 2007.

In 2022, the Lancers won the Big South tournament and earned their first trip to the NCAA tournament as a Division I program. In the 2021-2022 season, Longwood had the best record in the Big South (15-1) and won the regular-season conference championship (North Division). In the Big South tournament championship, the team held the lead over Winthrop wire-to-wire through the entire game.

In 2024, the Lancers won the Big South men's basketball tournament for the second time in three years and earned a berth in the NCAA Division I Tournament. In the Big South Tournament, the team entered as a 5-seed and beat No. 4 seed Gardner-Webb, No. 1 seed High Point, and No. 2 seed UNC-Asheville.

The Lancers have been members of three conferences in their history: the Division II Mason–Dixon Conference from 1983 to 1988 (not to be confused with another defunct conference with the same name, which disbanded in 1974) and the-then Carolinas–Virginia Athletic Conference from 1995 to 2003. Longwood spent nine seasons as an independent during and after reclassification to Division I, until they joined the Big South Conference in 2012.

Longwood previously reached the NCAA tournament three times during its Division II history and once at the Division III level. In 1988, Longwood won a share of the Mason-Dixon Conference regular season title, and in 2001, won the CVAC tournament championship as a 3 seed.

The Lancers currently play in Willett Hall on Jerome Kersey Court, named after former Longwood basketball player and NBA star Jerome Kersey. In 2019, Longwood announced a $15 million donation to begin construction of a new, 72,000 square foot convocation and events center that will replace Willett Hall as the venue for Lancer basketball. The Joan Perry Brock Center, named after its benefactor, will seat up to 3,000, and is scheduled to open in 2023.

The Lancers have had nine different head coaches of their men's basketball team, as detailed below. The current head coach, former UMBC director of recruiting Griff Aldrich, joined the program in 2018.

=== Conference affiliations ===
- 1976–77 to 1980–81: NCAA Division III Independent
- 1981–82 to 1982–83: NCAA Division II Independent
- 1983–84 to 1987–88: Mason–Dixon Conference
- 1988–89 to 1994–95: NCAA Division II Independent
- 1995–96 to 2002–03: Carolinas–Virginia Athletic Conference
- 2003–04: NCAA Division II Independent
- 2004–05 to 2011–12: NCAA Division I Independent
- 2012–13 to present: Big South Conference

== Postseason ==
=== NCAA tournament results ===
The Lancers have appeared in two NCAA tournaments. Their combined record is 0–2.

Year	Seed	Round	Opponent	Result
2022	#14 South	First round	#3 Tennessee	L 56–88
2024	#16 South	First round	#1 Houston	L 46–86

=== CBI ===
The Lancers have appeared in the Division I College Basketball Invitational (CBI) tournament two times. Their record is 1–2.

Year	Round	Opponent	Result
2019	First round Second Round	Southern Miss; DePaul	W 90–68; L 89–97
2021	First round	Pepperdine	L 66–80

=== NCAA Division II tournament results ===
The Lancers have appeared in the NCAA Division II tournament three times. Their combined record is 2–4.

Year	Round	Opponent	Result
1994	Regional Quarterfinals; Regional semifinals Regional 3rd-place game	Carson–Newman; Norfolk State; Elizabeth City State	W 76–63; L 59–61; L 87–88
1995	Regional Quarterfinals	Shaw	L 76–83
2001	Regional Quarterfinals; Regional semifinals	West Chester; Queens (NC)	W 103–95; L 76–77

=== NCAA Division III tournament results ===
The Lancers appeared in the NCAA Division III tournament once. Their record is 3–2.

Year	Round	Opponent	Result
1980	Regional semifinals Regional Finals; Elite Eight; Final Four; National 3rd-place game	Framingham State; Clark; Potsdam State; North Park; Wittenberg	W 73–63; W 70–60; W 78–61; L 55–57; L 47–48

== Year-by-year records ==
Statistics overview
Season	Coach	Overall	Conference	Standing	Postseason
Allan McNamee (Division III Independent) (1976–1977)
1976–77	Allan McNamee	2–9			
Allen McNamee:		2–9 (.182)			
Bill McAdams (Division III Independent) (1977–1978)
1977–78	Bill McAdams	8–16			
Bill McAdams:		8–16 (.333)			
Ron Bash (Division III Independent) (1978–1980)
1978–79	Ron Bash	19–8			
1979–80	Ron Bash	28–3			NCAA Division III Final Four
Ron Bash (Division II Independent) (1980–1981)
1980–81	Ron Bash	19–9			
Ron Bash:		66–20 (.767)			
Cal Luther (Division II Independent) (1981–1983)
1981–82	Cal Luther	15–8			
1982–83	Cal Luther	15–10			
Cal Luther (Mason–Dixon Conference) (1983–1988)
1983–84	Cal Luther	15–12	7–3	2nd	
1984–85	Cal Luther	11–17	3–7	4th	
1985–86	Cal Luther	14–13	7–3	2nd	
1986–87	Cal Luther	13–14	3–5	3rd	
1987–88	Cal Luther	19–10	6–2	T–1st	
Cal Luther (Division II Independent) (1988–1990)
1988–89	Cal Luther	20–7			
1989–90	Cal Luther	14–14			
Cal Luther:		136–105 (.564)	26–20 (.565)		
Ron Carr (Division II Independent) (1990–1995)
1990–91	Ron Carr	11–17			
1991–92	Ron Carr	14–14			
1992–93	Ron Carr	17–10			
1993–94	Ron Carr	23–6			NCAA Division II Regional semifinals
1994–95	Ron Carr	19–9			NCAA Division II Regional Quarterfinals
Ron Carr (Carolinas–Virginia Athletic Conference (CVAC)) (1995–1999)
1995–96	Ron Carr	11–17	7–11	8th	
1996–97	Ron Carr	11–17	6–14	T–7th	
1997–98	Ron Carr	13–15	9–9	7th	
1998–99	Ron Carr	8–19	6–12	9th	
Ron Carr:		127–124 (.506)	28–46 (.378)		
Mike Leeder (Carolinas–Virginia Athletic Conference (CVAC)) (1999–2003)
1999–2000	Mike Leeder	4–22	2–16	T-11th	
2000–01	Mike Leeder	23–8	15–7	T–2nd	NCAA Division II Regional semifinals
2001–02	Mike Leeder	13–13	10–10	6th	
2002–03	Mike Leeder	15–14	11–9		
Mike Leeder:		55–57 (.491)	38–42 (.475)		
Mike Gillian (Division II Independent) (2003–2004)
2003–04	Mike Gillian	5–22			
Mike Gillian (Division I Independent) (2004–2012)
2004–05	Mike Gillian	1–30			
2005–06	Mike Gillian	10–20			
2006–07	Mike Gillian	9–22			
2007–08	Mike Gillian	9–22			
2008–09	Mike Gillian	17–14			
2009–10	Mike Gillian	12–19			
2010–11	Mike Gillian	12–19			
2011–12	Mike Gillian	10–21			
Mike Gillian (Big South Conference) (2012–2013)
2012–13	Mike Gillian	8–25	4–12	6th (North)	
Mike Gillian:		93–214 (.303)	4–12 (.250)		
Jayson Gee (Big South Conference) (2013–2018)
2013–14	Jayson Gee	8–24	3–13	6th (North)	
2014–15	Jayson Gee	11–23	5–13	9th	
2015–16	Jayson Gee	10–23	5–13	T–8th	
2016–17	Jayson Gee	6–24	3–15	9th	
2017–18	Jayson Gee	7–26	3–15	10th	
Jayson Gee:		42–120 (.259)	19–69 (.216)		
Griff Aldrich (Big South Conference) (2018–2025)
2018–19	Griff Aldrich	16–18	5–11	9th	CBI Quarterfinals
2019–20	Griff Aldrich	15–17	9–9	4th	
2020–21	Griff Aldrich	12–17	10–10	T–5th	CBI Quarterfinals
2021–22	Griff Aldrich	26–6	15–1	1st (North)	NCAA Division I Round of 64
2022–23	Griff Aldrich	20–12	12–6	2nd	
2023–24	Griff Aldrich	21–14	6–10	T–5th	NCAA Division I Round of 64
2024–25	Griff Aldrich	18–14	7–9	T–5th	
2025–26	Griff Aldrich	16–16	8–8	T–4th	
Griff Aldrich:		143–116 (.552)			
Total:		681–777 (.467)			
National champion Postseason invitational champion Conference regular season champion Conference regular season and conference tournament champion Division regular season champion Division regular season and conference tournament champion Conference tournament champion

== Notable players ==
=== Jerome Kersey #54 ===
Jerome Kersey is widely known as the best player in Longwood history. Playing from 1980 to 1984 Kersey set school records for points, rebounds, steals and blocked shots while making 57% of his baskets. As a senior, his rebounding average of 14.2 led all Division II players.

In 1984, Kersey was selected 46th overall in the NBA draft by the Portland Trail Blazers. He became a starter and was part of the nucleus of a strong Portland team, along with Clyde Drexler, Terry Porter, Buck Williams, and Kevin Duckworth that made it to the NBA Finals two out of the next three years (in 1990 and 1992). Kersey also finished second to Michael Jordan in the 1987 Slam Dunk Contest. In 1999, Kersey won an NBA Championship with the San Antonio Spurs. He would eventually retire in 2001 as a member of the Milwaukee Bucks.

In May 2006, Kersey graduated from Longwood, having only needed two more college courses to graduate for some years.

=== Kevin Jefferson #33 ===
Kevin Jefferson played for the Lancers from 1986–1990. Jefferson ended his career with 1,806 career points, a record that would hold for 22 years.

=== Colin Ducharme #52 ===
The 6'9" Ducharme would transfer to Longwood from the University of Virginia for his final year of eligibility in 2000. Ducharme averaged 19.6 points and 15.8 rebounds per game in his one year in Farmville. He led Longwood to a CVAC championship and an NCAA tournament appearance while being named the Division II National Player of the Year by multiple outlets. Ducharme remains only one of two retired numbers in Longwood history, with the other being Jerome Kersey.

=== Antwan Carter #4 ===
Antwan Carter became the most efficient players in Longwood history and its best player so far in the Division I era. Playing from 2008–2012, Carter would break Kevin Jefferson's all-time scoring record and finished his career scoring 1,886 points. Carter also finished second in Longwood history in rebounds with 1,008.
