= Ronnie Thomas (basketball) =

American basketball coach (born 1992)

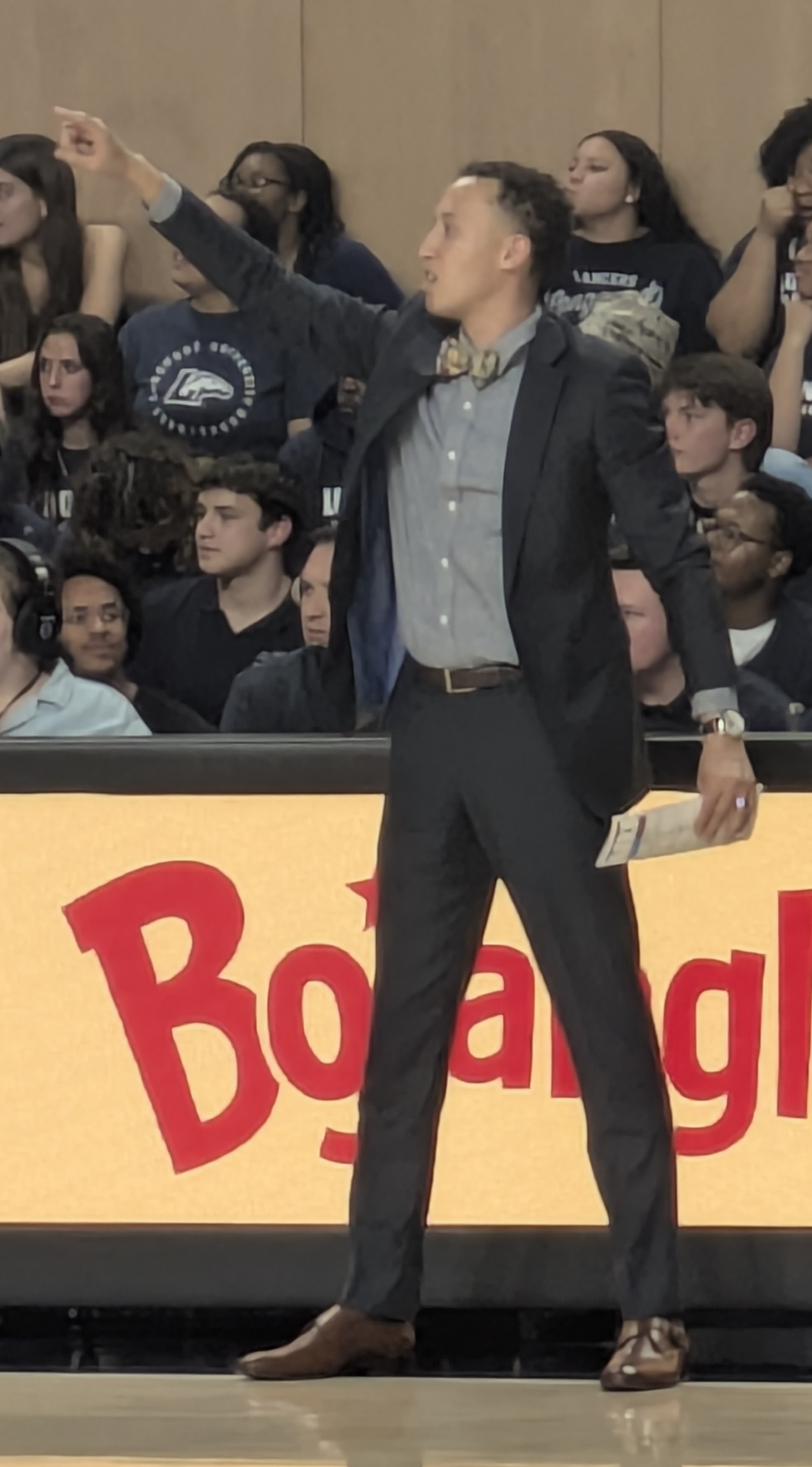

Current position
- Title: Head coach
- Team: Longwood
- Conference: Big South
- Record: 20–18 (.526)

Biographical details
- Born: June 6, 1992 (age 34)

Playing career
- 2010–2014: Bridgewater
- 2014–2015: Ulster Elks

Coaching career (HC unless noted)
- 2015–2018: Guilford (assistant)
- 2018–2020: Guilford (Associate head coach)
- 2021–2025: Longwood (assistant)
- 2025–present: Longwood

Administrative career (AD unless noted)
- 2016–2018: Guilford (recruiting coordinator)
- 2020–2021: Longwood (director of recruiting & program development)

Head coaching record
- Overall: 20–18 (.526)

Ronnie Thomas (born July 6, 1992) is an American basketball coach. He is currently the head coach of the Longwood Lancers men's basketball team.

== Career ==
Thomas played college basketball at Bridgewater College. After playing one season semi-professionally for the Ulster Elks, he joined the coaching staff at Guilford College as an assistant. After five seasons as a coach at Guilford, Thomas became the director of recruiting and program development at Longwood University. One year later, he was promoted to an assistant coach role with the Lancers.

On March 23, 2025, Thomas was named the next head coach at Longwood, replacing Griff Aldrich.

== Head coaching record ==
Record table
Season	Team	Overall	Conference	Standing	Postseason
Longwood (Big South) (2025–present)
2025–26	Longwood	16–16	8–8	T–4th	
2026–27	Longwood	4–2	0–0		
Longwood:		20–18 (.526)	8–8 (.500)		
Total:		20–18 (.526)			
National champion Postseason invitational champion Conference regular season champion Conference regular season and conference tournament champion Division regular season champion Division regular season and conference tournament champion Conference tournament champion
