= Griff Aldrich =

American basketball coach and lawyer (born 1974)

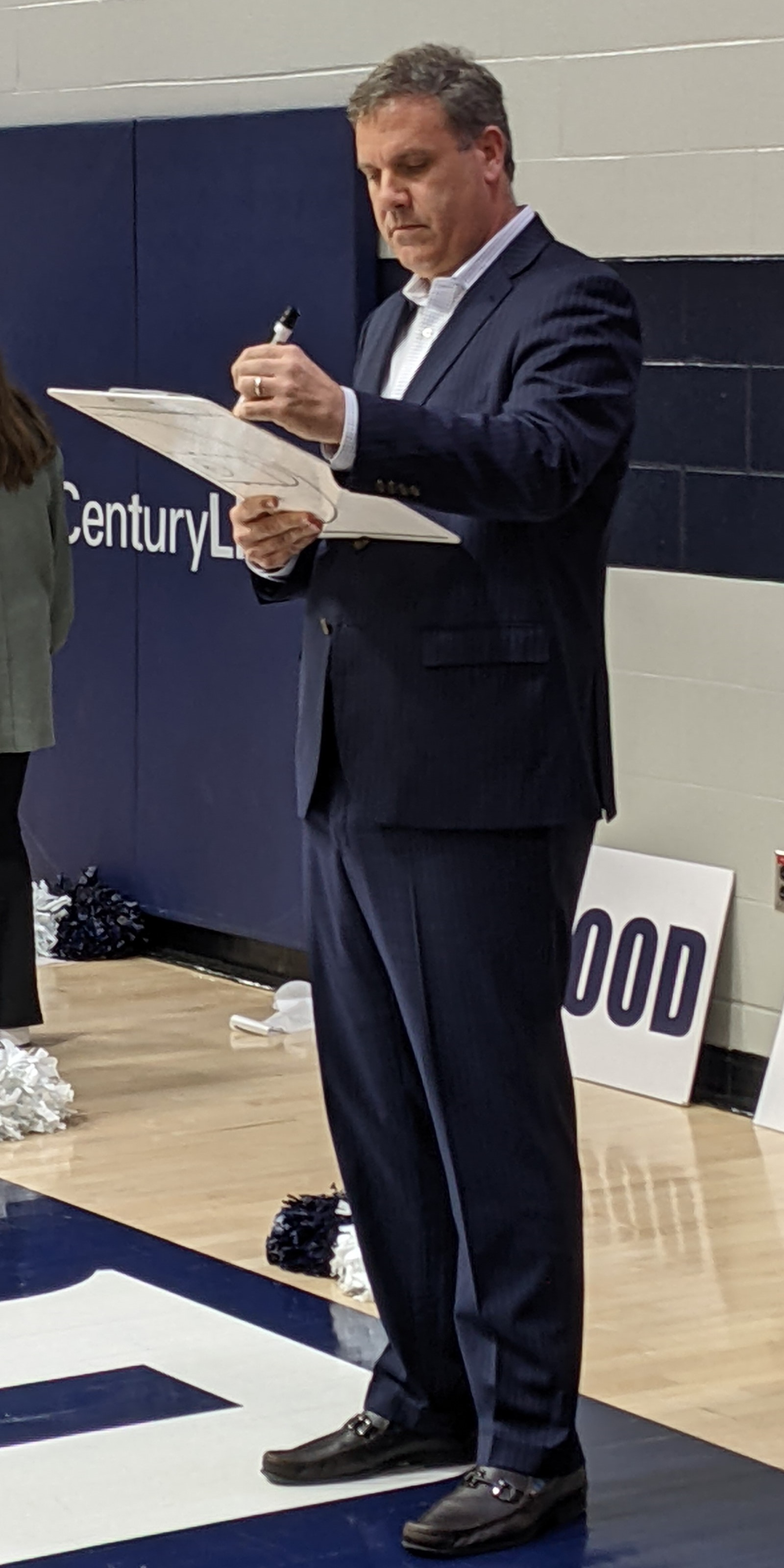
- Aldrich at Willett Hall in 2023

Current position
- Title: Head coach
- Team: Pepperdine
- Conference: WCC
- Record: 3–3 (.500)

Biographical details
- Born: June 28, 1974 (age 52)
- Education: Hampden-Sydney College (BA); University of Virginia (JD)

Playing career
- 1992–1996: Hampden–Sydney

Coaching career (HC unless noted)
- 1999–2000: Hampden–Sydney (assistant)
- 2018–2025: Longwood
- 2025–2026: Virginia (associate HC)
- 2026–present: Pepperdine

Administrative career (AD unless noted)
- 2016–2018: UMBC (dir. of recruiting)

Head coaching record
- Overall: 130–103 (.558)
- Tournaments: 0–2 (NCAA Division I); 1–2 (CBI)

Accomplishments and honors

Championships
- 2 Big South tournament (2022, 2024); Big South regular season (2022); Big South North Division (2022)

Awards
- Big South Coach of the Year (2022)

Scott Griffith Aldrich (born June 28, 1974) is an American college basketball coach and lawyer, currently the head coach for the Pepperdine Waves of the West Coast Conference (WCC). He previously served as head coach of the Longwood Lancers men's basketball team from 2018 to 2025.

== Playing career ==
Aldrich played at Hampden–Sydney under Tony Shaver, where he was team captain his senior year and a part of two NCAA Tournament squads for the Tigers. Aldrich also was a member of the Chi Phi fraternity and was elected to the Phi Beta Kappa and Omicron Delta Kappa honors societies.

== Coaching career ==
After graduation from the University of Virginia School of Law, Aldrich returned to Hampden–Sydney for the 1999–2000 season as an assistant coach, where he assisted in the Tigers' perfect 24–0 regular season, and No. 1 national ranking in Division III. He also served as head coach of the Tigers' cross country team.

Aldrich then entered the private sector for 16 years, while also coaching AAU basketball in the Houston, Texas area. Among the players Aldrich coached in AAU include DeAndre Jordan and Orie Lemon. He returned to college coaching in 2016, joining Hampden–Sydney classmate Ryan Odom's staff at UMBC as the director of basketball operations, and Director of Recruiting/Program Development. Aldrich was part of the Retrievers' historic upset over top-ranked Virginia in the 2018 NCAA Division I men's basketball tournament.

On March 22, 2018, Aldrich was named the ninth head coach in Longwood University program history, replacing Jayson Gee. In his first season, he led the Lancers to their first ever Division I postseason appearance in the 2019 College Basketball Invitational, and was named a finalist for the Joe B. Hall Award (given for most outstanding first-year head coach), which had been won by Odom in 2017. His second season saw Longwood reach fourth place in the Big South Conference, their highest finish in the league since joining in 2012. In July 2021, Aldrich received a contract extension through 2028. At the close of the 2021–22 season, Aldrich was named the Big South Coach of the Year for leading Longwood to the regular season title. Five days later, Longwood won their first ever Big South Conference tournament and earned a bid to the NCAA tournament.

The following season saw the Lancers win a second consecutive 20-win season for the first time in program history, and Aldrich was named a finalist for the Skip Prosser Man of the Year Award. Subsequently, Aldrich received a contract extension through 2034. After the Lancers won the 2024 Big South Conference tournament, punching their ticket to the NCAA tournament for the second time in three years, Aldrich was again named a finalist for the 2023-24 Skip Prosser Man of the Year Award.

On March 30, 2026, Aldrich was named as the head coach for the Pepperdine Waves, replacing Ed Schilling.

== Non-coaching career ==
Aldrich was a partner at Vinson & Elkins law firm, and also was the founder of an oil and gas company in Texas, as well as a managing director and chief financial officer at a private investment firm.

== Head coaching record ==
Record table
Season	Team	Overall	Conference	Standing	Postseason
Longwood Lancers (Big South Conference) (2018–2025)
2018–19	Longwood	16–18	5–11	9th	CBI Quarterfinals
2019–20	Longwood	14–18	9–9	4th	
2020–21	Longwood	12–17	10–10	T–5th	CBI Quarterfinals
2021–22	Longwood	26–7	15–1	1st (North)	NCAA Division I Round of 64
2022–23	Longwood	20–12	12–6	T–2nd	
2023–24	Longwood	21–14	6–10	T–5th	NCAA Division I Round of 64
2024–25	Longwood	18–14	7–9	T–5th	
Longwood:		127–100 (.559)	64–56 (.533)		
Pepperdine Waves (West Coast Conference) (2026–present)
2026–27	Pepperdine	3–3	0–0	–	
Pepperdine:		3–3 (.500)	0–0 (–)		
Total:		130–103 (.558)			

== Personal life ==
Aldrich is married to Julie Aldrich. They have three adopted children. Aldrich is a Christian.
