= 2020–21 Big South Conference men's basketball season =

- League: NCAA Division I
- Sport: Basketball
- Teams: 11

Regular season

Tournament

Big South men's basketball seasons

2020–21 Big South men's basketball standings
	Conf.				Overall
Team	W		L	PCT	W		L	PCT
Winthrop †	17	–	1	.944	23	–	2	.920
Radford	12	–	6	.667	15	–	12	.556
Campbell	11	–	6	.647	17	–	10	.630
UNC Asheville	9	–	5	.643	10	–	10	.500
Longwood	10	–	10	.500	12	–	17	.414
Gardner–Webb	10	–	10	.500	11	–	15	.423
Hampton	9	–	9	.500	11	–	14	.440
High Point	6	–	11	.353	9	–	15	.375
USC Upstate	5	–	11	.313	5	–	18	.217
Presbyterian	5	–	12	.294	7	–	15	.318
Charleston Southern	2	–	15	.118	3	–	18	.143
† 2021 Big South tournament winner Charleston Southern suspended their season on February 23, 2021.

The 2020–21 Big South Conference men's basketball season began with practices in October 2020, followed by the start of the 2020–21 NCAA Division I men's basketball season in November. Conference play begins in January 2021 and will conclude in March 2021.

== Preseason Awards ==
The preseason coaches' poll was announced by the league office on November 10, 2020.

=== Preseason men's basketball coaches poll ===
(First place votes in parentheses)

1. Winthrop (21) 261
2. UNC Asheville (2) 214
3. Charleston Southern 192
4. Gardner-Webb (1) 188
5. USC Upstate 149
6. Radford 127
7. High Point 117
8. Longwood 111
9. Hampton 92
10. Campbell 78
11. Presbyterian 55

== Honors ==
Preseason honors were announced by the league office on November 10, 2020.

Honor	Recipient
Preseason Player of the Year	Phlandrous Fleming Jr., Charleston Southern
Preseason All-Big South First Team	Phlandrous Fleming Jr., Charleston Southern
Preseason All-Big South First Team	D. J. Burns Jr., Winthrop
Preseason All-Big South First Team	DeVon Baker, UNC Asheville
Preseason All-Big South First Team	Chandler Vaudrin, Winthrop
Preseason All-Big South First Team	Jaheam Cornwall, Gardner-Webb
Preseason All-Big South Second Team	Tommy Bruner, USC Upstate
Preseason All-Big South Second Team	LJ Thorpe, UNC Asheville
Preseason All-Big South Second Team	John-Michael Wright, High Point
Preseason All-Big South Second Team	Everette Hammond, USC Upstate
Preseason All-Big South Second Team	Kareem Reid, Gardner-Webb

== Conference matrix ==
	Campbell	Charleston Southern	Gardner–Webb	Hampton	High Point	Longwood	Presbyterian	Radford	UNC Asheville	USC Upstate	Winthrop
vs. Campbell	–	0−2	1−1	0−2	0−1	1−1	0−2	2−0	0−0	0–2	2–0
vs. Charleston Southern	2–0	–	2−0	2−0	1−1	2−0	0−1	2−0	2−0	0–0	2–0
vs. Gardner-Webb	1–1	0−2	–	1–1	2−0	2−0	0−2	0−2	1−1	1–1	2–0
vs. Hampton	2–0	0−2	1−1	–	1−1	1−1	1−1	2−0	1−1	0−2	0–0
vs. High Point	1–0	1−1	0−2	1−1	–	2−0	1−1	0−0	2−0	1–1	2–0
vs. Longwood	1−1	0−2	0−2	1−1	0−2	–	1−1	2−0	1−1	2–0	2–0
vs. Presbyterian	2–0	1−0	2−0	1−1	1−1	1−1	–	1−1	0−0	1–1	2–0
vs. Radford	0–2	0−2	2−0	0−2	0−0	0−2	1−1	–	1−1	0–2	2−0
vs. UNC Asheville	0–0	0−2	1−1	1−1	0−2	1−1	0−0	1−1	–	0–0	1–1
vs. USC Upstate	2−0	0−0	1−1	2−0	1−1	0−2	1−1	2−0	0−0	–	2–0
vs. Winthrop	0–2	0−2	0−2	0−0	0−2	0−2	0−2	0−2	1−1	0–2	−
Total	11–6	2–15	10–10	9–9	6–11	10–10	5–12	12–6	9–5	5–11	17–1

== All-Big South awards ==
=== Big South men's basketball weekly awards ===
Week	Player(s) of the Week	School	Newcomer of the Week	School
Nov 30	John-Michael Wright	High Point	JaQuavian Florence	Charleston Southern
Dec 7	Chandler Vaudrin	Winthrop	Rayshon Harrison	Presbyterian
Dec 14	Jordan Whitfield & Chandler Vaudrin (2)	Campbell & Winthrop	Justin Hill	Longwood
Dec 21	Charles Falden	Winthrop	Rayshon Harrison (2)	Presbyterian
Dec 28	Davion Warren	Hampton	Rayshon Harrison (3)	Presbyterian
Jan 4	Davion Warren (2)	Hampton	Rayshon Harrison (4)	Presbyterian
Jan 11	Dalvin White & Chandler Vaudrin (3)	USC Upstate & Winthrop	Fah'mir Ali	Radford
Jan 18	Davion Warren (3)	Hampton	Justin Hill (2)	Longwood
Jan 25	Juan Munoz	Longwood	D'Maurian Williams	Gardner-Webb
Feb 1	Cedric Henderson Jr.	Campbell	Rayshon Harrison (5)	Presbyterian
Feb 8	Dravon Mangum	Radford	Jamaine Mann	Gardner-Webb
Feb 15	Phlandrous Fleming Jr.	Charleston Southern	Justin Hill (3)	Longwood
Feb 22	Jaheam Cornwall	Gardner-Webb	Rayshon Harrison (6)	Presbyterian
Feb 25	Phlandrous Fleming Jr. (2)	Charleston Southern	JaQuavian Florence (2) & Rayshon Harrison (7)	Charleston Southern & Presbyterian
