= High Point Panthers men's basketball statistical leaders =

The High Point Panthers basketball statistical leaders are individual statistical leaders of the High Point Panthers men's basketball program in various categories, including points, rebounds, assists, steals, and blocks. Within those areas, the lists identify single-game, single-season, and career leaders. The Panthers represent High Point University in the NCAA's Big South Conference.

High Point began competing in intercollegiate basketball in 1927. However, the school's record book does not generally list records from before the 1950s, as records from before this period are often incomplete and inconsistent. Since scoring was much lower in this era, and teams played much fewer games during a typical season, it is likely that few or no players from this era would appear on these lists anyway.

The NCAA did not officially record assists as a stat until the 1983–84 season, and blocks and steals until the 1985–86 season, but High Point's record books includes players in these stats before these seasons. These lists are updated through the end of the 2020–21 season.

== Scoring ==
Career
Rank	Player	Points	Seasons
1	Gene Littles	2,398	1965–66 1966–67 1967–68 1968–69
2	John Brown	2,229	2012–13 2013–14 2014–15 2015–16
3	Nick Barbour	2,121	2008–09 2009–10 2010–11 2011–12
4	Arizona Reid	2,069	2004–05 2005–06 2006–07 2007–08
5	Brett Speight	1,877	1993–94 1994–95 1995–96 1996–97
6	Pete Collins	1,838	1970–71 1971–72 1972–73 1973–74
7	Danny Sewell	1,667	1956–57 1957–58 1958–59 1959–60
8	Danny Witt	1,648	1966–67 1967–68 1968–69 1969–70
9	Tubby Smith	1,589	1969–70 1970–71 1971–72 1972–73
10	John-Michael Wright	1,498	2019–20 2020–21 2021–22

Season
Rank	Player	Points	Season
1	Danny Witt	779	1969–70
2	Arizona Reid	742	2007–08
3	Gene Littles	725	1968–69
4	Charlie Floyd	684	1978–79
5	Arizona Reid	671	2006–07
6	Brett Speight	647	1996–97
7	Pete Collins	637	1973–74
8	Nick Barbour	633	2011–12
9	Robert Martin	627	1994–95
10	Kirk Stewart	620	1964–65

Single game
Rank	Player	Points	Season	Opponent
1	Kirk Stewart	51	1964–65	Belmont-Abbey

== Rebounds ==
Career
Rank	Player	Rebounds	Seasons
1	Pete Collins	1,268	1970–71 1971–72 1972–73 1973–74
2	Dale Neel	1,112	1961–62 1962–63 1963–64 1964–65
3	Jim Picka	1,070	1965–66 1966–67 1967–68 1968–69
4	Arizona Reid	1,013	2004–05 2005–06 2006–07 2007–08
5	Phil Garrison	893	1960–61 1961–62 1962–63 1963–64
6	John Brown	801	2012–13 2013–14 2014–15 2015–16
7	Kirk Stewart	796	1962–63 1963–64 1964–65
8	Bill Fallin	782	1960–61 1961–62 1962–63 1963–64
9	Gene Littles	773	1965–66 1966–67 1967–68 1968–69
10	Brett Speight	757	1993–94 1994–95 1995–96 1996–97

Season
Rank	Player	Rebounds	Season
1	Jim Picka	424	1968–69
2	Dale Neel	400	1964–65
3	Kirk Stewart	353	1964–65
4	Pete Collins	350	1973–74
5	Juslin Bodo Bodo	347	2023–24
6	Pete Collins	343	1972–73
7	Arizona Reid	342	2007–08
8	Charlie Floyd	340	1978–79
9	Dale Neel	339	1963–64
10	Pete Collins	336	1970–71

Single game
Rank	Player	Rebounds	Season	Opponent
1	Steve Afendis	31	1956–57	Newberry

== Assists ==
Career
Rank	Player	Assists	Seasons
1	Mike Jefferson	470	2005–06 2006–07 2007–08
2	Landon Quick	376	2003–04 2004–05 2005–06 2006–07
3	George Byers	330	1986–87 1987–88 1988–89 1989–90
4	John Hamilton	308	1981–82 1982–83 1983–84 1984–85
5	Bryant Randleman	302	2019–20 2020–21 2021–22 2022–23
6	Adam Weary	297	2012–13 2013–14 2014–15 2015–16
7	Eugene Harris	263	2006–07 2007–08 2008–09 2009–10
8	Jairus Simms	260	2009–10 2010–11 2011–12 2012–13
9	John-Michael Wright	252	2019–20 2020–21 2021–22
10	Haiishen McIntyre	226	2012–13 2013–14 2014–15 2015–16

Season
Rank	Player	Assists	Season
1	Mike Jefferson	216	2007–08
2	Tracy Goss	185	1996–97
3	Mike Jefferson	162	2006–07
4	David Singleton	144	2008–09
5	Damond Van Weerdhuizen	137	1997–98
6	Rob Martin	136	2025–26
7	Charlie Floyd	135	1978–79
8	Kenny Drummond	134	1988–89
9	Landon Quick	123	2006–07
	Dameon Foster	123	1995–96

== Steals ==
Career
Rank	Player	Steals	Seasons
1	John Brown	182	2012–13 2013–14 2014–15 2015–16
2	Arizona Reid	153	2004–05 2005–06 2006–07 2007–08
3	Derek Van Weerdhuizen	140	1998–99 1999–00 2000–01
4	Landon Quick	137	2003–04 2004–05 2005–06 2006–07
5	Danny Gathings	136	2002–03 2003–04 2004–05
6	Bryant Randleman	133	2019–20 2020–21 2021–22 2022–23
7	Nick Barbour	129	2008–09 2009–10 2010–11 2011–12
	Eugene Harris	129	2006–07 2007–08 2008–09 2009–10
9	Mantas Ignatavicius	124	1998–99 1999–00 2000–01 2001–02
10	Dustin Van Weerdhuizen	118	2000–01 2001–02 2002–03

Season
Rank	Player	Steals	Season
1	Tracy Gross	114	1996–97
2	Kenny Drummond	108	1988–89
3	Akeem Scott	64	2005–06
4	Steve Wall	63	1990–91
5	Mantas Ignatavicius	58	1999–00
6	Mantas Ignatavicius	57	1998–99
	Anthony Jackson	57	1999–00
	Brian Wise	57	1995–96
9	Zion White	56	2003–04
10	David Singleton	55	2008–09

== Blocks ==
Career
Rank	Player	Blocks	Seasons
1	Cruz Daniels	297	2006–07 2007–08 2008–09 2009–10
2	John Brown	167	2012–13 2013–14 2014–15 2015–16
3	Zack Austin	135	2021–22 2022–23
4	Juslin Bodo Bodo	119	2023–24 2024–25
5	Issa Konare	108	2003–04 2004–05 2005–06
6	Brett Speight	80	1993–94 1994–95 1995–96 1996–97
	Emmanuel Izunabor	80	2019–20 2020–21 2021–22 2022–23
8	Caden Sanchez	70	2018–19 2019–20 2020–21 2021–22
9	Corey Law	65	2009–10 2010–11 2011–12 2012–13
10	Chad Reeves	64	1995–96 1996–97

Season
Rank	Player	Blocks	Season
1	Cruz Daniels	83	2008–09
2	Cruz Daniels	75	2009–10
3	Cruz Daniels	74	2007–08
4	Issa Konare	69	2005–06
	Zack Austin	69	2021–22
	Juslin Bodo Bodo	69	2023–24
7	Zack Austin	66	2022–23
8	Cruz Daniels	65	2006–07
9	Owen Aquino	60	2025–26
10	John Brown	51	2013–14
