= List of Charleston Southern Buccaneers men's basketball head coaches =

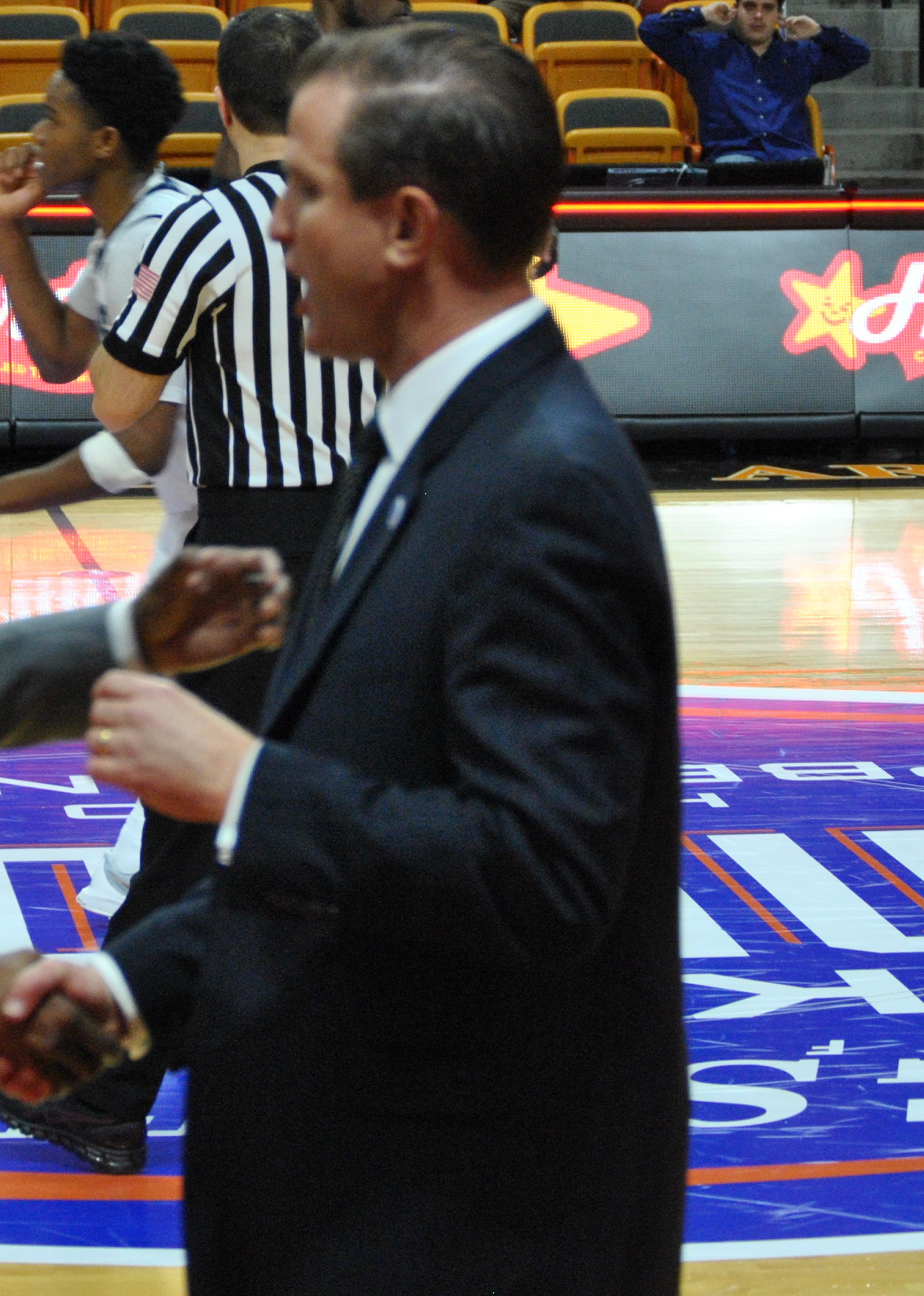
Barclay Radebaugh, the current head coach of the Charleston Southern Buccaneers, and the winningest head coach in Buccaneers history.

The following is a list of Charleston Southern Buccaneers men's basketball head coaches. There have been 12 head coaches of the Buccaneers in their 58-season history.

Charleston Southern's current head coach is Barclay Radebaugh. He was hired as the Buccaneers' head coach in May 2005, replacing Jim Platt, who resigned after the 2004–05 season to join the staff at Army as an assistant coach.

No.	Tenure	Coach	Years	Record	Pct.
1	1965–1967	Howard Bagwell	2	27–16	.628
2	1967–1971	Mel Gibson	4	57–38	.600
3	1971–1973	Al Ferner	2	26–28	.481
4	1973–1975	Billy Henry	2	9–38	.191
5	1975–1978	Danny Monkl	3	18–62	.225
6	1978–1980	Danny Reese	2	4–48	.077
7	1980–1983	Phil Carter	3	34–46	.425
8	1983–1987	Tommy Gaither	4	70–46	.603
9	1987–1996	Gary Edwards	9	121–133	.476
10	1996–2000	Tom Conrad	4	42–72	.368
11	2000–2005	Jim Platt	5	55–89	.382
12	2005–present (Note: Charleston Southern vacated 51 wins from the 2012–13, 2013–14, and 2014–15 seasons. Radebaugh's on-court record is 226–320)	Barclay Radebaugh	18	175–320	.354
Totals		12 coaches	58 seasons	638–936	.405
Records updated through end of 2022–23 season Source
