= 2020–21 Winthrop Eagles men's basketball team =

American college basketball season

2020–21 Winthrop Eagles men's basketball
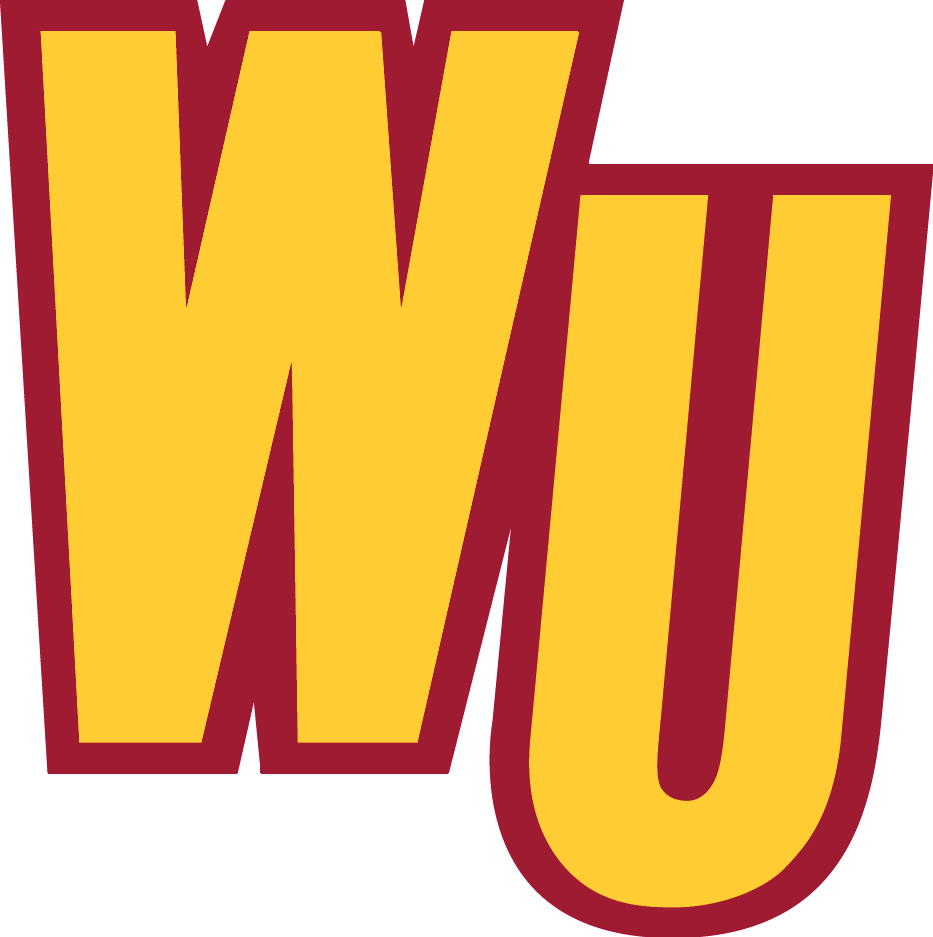

Big South regular season and tournament champions

NCAA tournament, First Round
- Conference: Big South Conference
- Record: 23–2 (17–1 Big South)
- Head coach: Pat Kelsey (9th season)
- Associate head coach: Dave Davis
- Assistant coaches: Brian Kloman; Justin Gray
- Home arena: Winthrop Coliseum

2020–21 Big South men's basketball standings
	Conf.				Overall
Team	W		L	PCT	W		L	PCT
Winthrop †	17	–	1	.944	23	–	2	.920
Radford	12	–	6	.667	15	–	12	.556
Campbell	11	–	6	.647	17	–	10	.630
UNC Asheville	9	–	5	.643	10	–	10	.500
Longwood	10	–	10	.500	12	–	17	.414
Gardner–Webb	10	–	10	.500	11	–	15	.423
Hampton	9	–	9	.500	11	–	14	.440
High Point	6	–	11	.353	9	–	15	.375
USC Upstate	5	–	11	.313	5	–	18	.217
Presbyterian	5	–	12	.294	7	–	15	.318
Charleston Southern	2	–	15	.118	3	–	18	.143
† 2021 Big South tournament winner Charleston Southern suspended their season on February 23, 2021.

The 2020–21 Winthrop Eagles men's basketball team represented Winthrop University in the 2020–21 NCAA Division I men's basketball season. The Eagles, led by 9th-year head coach Pat Kelsey, played their home games at the Winthrop Coliseum in Rock Hill, South Carolina as members of the Big South Conference. They finished the season 23–2, 17–1 in Big South Play to finish as regular season champions. They defeated High Point, Longwood, and Campbell to be champions of the Big South tournament. They received the Big South’s automatic bid to the NCAA tournament where they lost in the first round to Villanova.

== Previous season ==
The Eagles finished the 2019–20 season 24–10, 15–3 in Big South play to finish as Big South regular season co-champions, alongside Radford. Due to tiebreakers, they received the #2 seed in the Big South tournament. They defeated the #7 seed USC Upstate in the quarterfinals, 106–70. In the semifinals, they defeated the #3 seed Gardner–Webb, 78–66, to clinch their spot in the Big South tournament championship game. There, they matched up against the #5 seed Hampton, winning 76–68, earning the Big South's automatic bid into the NCAA tournament. However, the NCAA Tournament would be cancelled due to the COVID-19 pandemic.

== Roster ==
2020–21 Winthrop Eagles men's basketball team
Players
Coaches

Pos.	#	Name	Height	Weight	Year	Previous school	Hometown
G	0	Russell Jones Jr.	5 ft 8 in (1.73 m)	175 lb (79 kg)	So	Westwood High School	Blythewood, South Carolina
G	1	Toneari Lane	6 ft 5 in (1.96 m)	210 lb (95 kg)	Fr	Grayson High School	Atlanta, Georgia
C	2	Tom Pupavac	6 ft 10 in (2.08 m)	230 lb (104 kg)	Sr	Belmont High School	Geelong, Australia
G	3	Micheal Anumba	6 ft 4 in (1.93 m)	220 lb (100 kg)	Jr	Loreto College	Reggio Emilia, Italy
F	4	Kelton Talford	6 ft 7 in (2.01 m)	195 lb (88 kg)	Fr	Great Falls High School	Great Falls, South Carolina
G	11	Charles Falden	6 ft 3 in (1.91 m)	205 lb (93 kg)	Sr	Massanutten Military Academy	Richmond, Virginia
G	13	Nate Buss	5 ft 11 in (1.8 m)	175 lb (79 kg)	RS Jr	Verona Area High School	Verona, Wisconsin
G	21	Jamal King	6 ft 5 in (1.96 m)	230 lb (104 kg)	So	Wayne Christian School	Goldsboro, North Carolina
G	22	Kyle Zunic	6 ft 2 in (1.88 m)	200 lb (91 kg)	Sr	Lake Ginninderra College	Wollongong, Australia
G	25	Adonis Arms	6 ft 6 in (1.98 m)	205 lb (93 kg)	RS Sr	Northwest Nazarene	Milwaukee, Wisconsin
F	30	D. J. Burns	6 ft 9 in (2.06 m)	275 lb (125 kg)	RS So	Tennessee	Rock Hill, South Carolina
G	32	Josh Corbin	6 ft 3 in (1.91 m)	190 lb (86 kg)	So	Gahanna Lincoln High School	Gahanna, Ohio
F	33	Chase Claxton	6 ft 7 in (2.01 m)	185 lb (84 kg)	So	Legacy Early College	Greenville, South Carolina
G	35	Keyshawn Hunter	6 ft 3 in (1.91 m)	195 lb (88 kg)	Sr	Hohenfels High School	Charleston, South Carolina
G	52	Chandler Vaudrin	6 ft 7 in (2.01 m)	210 lb (95 kg)	RS Sr	Walsh	Uniontown, Ohio

Head coach

- Pat Kelsey (Xavier)

Assistant coach(es)

- Dave Davis (Warren Wilson)
- Brian Kloman (Tennessee)
- Justin Gray (Wake Forest)

Legend

- (C) Team captain
- (S) Suspended
- (I) Ineligible
- (W) Walk-on
- Injured
- Current redshirt

Roster
Last update: December 15, 2020

== Schedule and results ==
Date time, TV	Rank^{#}	Opponent^{#}	Result	Record	Site (attendance) city, state
Regular season
November 29, 2020*; 8:30 pm, ESPN3		vs. UNC Greensboro; Wade Houston Tipoff Classic	Postponed		KFC Yum! Center; Louisville, KY
December 1, 2020*; 8:30 pm, ESPN3		vs. UNC Greensboro; Wade Houston Tipoff Classic	W 75–67	1–0	KFC Yum! Center; Louisville, KY
December 7, 2020*; 7:00 pm, ESPN3		vs. Little Rock; Wade Houston Tipoff Classic	W 80–75	2–0	KFC Yum! Center (110); Louisville, KY
December 4, 2020*; 11:00 am, ESPN3		vs. Duquesne; Wade Houston Tipoff Classic	Canceled		KFC Yum! Center; Louisville, KY
December 12, 2020; 4:00 pm, ESPN+		at USC Upstate	W 95–77	3–0 (1–0)	G. B. Hodge Center (140); Spartanburg, SC
December 13, 2020; 2:00 pm, ESPN+		at USC Upstate	W 107–77	4–0 (2–0)	G. B. Hodge Center (140); Spartanburg, SC
December 19, 2020*; 4:00 pm, ESPN+		Furman	W 87–71	5–0	Winthrop Coliseum; Rock Hill, SC
December 30, 2020; 3:00 pm, ESPN+		Campbell	W 84–83	6–0 (3–0)	Winthrop Coliseum; Rock Hill, SC
December 31, 2020; 1:00 pm, ESPN+		Campbell	W 94–76	7–0 (4–0)	Winthrop Coliseum; Rock Hill, SC
January 4, 2021; 4:00 pm, ESPN+		at Charleston Southern	W 85–69	8–0 (5–0)	Buccaneer Field House (36); North Charleston, SC
January 5, 2021; 3:00 pm, ESPN+		at Charleston Southern	W 78–76	9–0 (6–0)	Buccaneer Field House (24); North Charleston, SC
January 9, 2021; 1:00 pm, ESPN+		Gardner–Webb	W 75–65	10–0 (7–0)	Winthrop Coliseum; Rock Hill, SC
January 10, 2021; 1:00 pm, ESPN+		Gardner–Webb	W 91–83	11–0 (8–0)	Winthrop Coliseum; Rock Hill, SC
January 14, 2021; 6:00 pm, ESPNU		Longwood	W 72–61	12–0 (9–0)	Winthrop Coliseum; Rock Hill, SC
January 15, 2021; 6:00 pm, ESPN+		Longwood	W 70–50	13–0 (10–0)	Winthrop Coliseum; Rock Hill, SC
January 19, 2021; 6:00 pm, ESPNU		at Presbyterian	W 72–58	14–0 (11–0)	Templeton Physical Education Center (20); Clinton, SC
January 20, 2021; 6:00 pm, ESPN+		at Presbyterian	W 78–66	15–0 (12–0)	Templeton Physical Education Center (15); Clinton, SC
January 24, 2021; 3:00 pm, ESPN+		Hampton	Postponed		Winthrop Coliseum; Rock Hill, SC
January 25, 2021; 6:00 pm, ESPN+		Hampton	Postponed		Winthrop Coliseum; Rock Hill, SC
January 28, 2021; 7:00 pm, ESPNU		UNC Asheville	W 84–80	16–0 (13–0)	Winthrop Coliseum (41); Rock Hill, SC
January 29, 2021; 6:00 pm, ESPN3		UNC Asheville	L 55–57	16–1 (13–1)	Winthrop Coliseum (43); Rock Hill, SC
February 11, 2021; 6:00 pm, ESPN+		at Radford	W 80–64	17–1 (14–1)	Dedmon Center (250); Radford, VA
February 12, 2021; 6:00 pm, ESPN3		at Radford	W 55–47	18–1 (15–1)	Dedmon Center (250); Radford, VA
February 18, 2021; 9:00 pm, ESPNU		at High Point	W 76–70	19–1 (16–1)	Millis Center; High Point, NC
February 19, 2021; 7:00 pm, ESPN+		at High Point	W 71–63	20–1 (17–1)	Millis Center; High Point, NC
Big South tournament
March 1, 2021; 6:00 pm, ESPN3	(1)	(8) High Point; Quarterfinals	W 83–54	21–1	Winthrop Coliseum; Rock Hill, SC
March 4, 2021; 7:00 pm, ESPN+	(1)	(5) Longwood; Semifinals	W 82–61	22–1	Winthrop Coliseum; Rock Hill, SC
March 7, 2021; 12:00 pm, ESPN	(1)	(3) Campbell; Championship	W 80–53	23–1	Winthrop Coliseum; Rock Hill, SC
NCAA tournament
March 19, 2021*; 9:57 pm, TNT	(12 S)	vs. (5 S) No. 18 Villanova; First Round	L 63–73	23–2	Indiana Farmers Coliseum; Indianapolis, IN
*Non-conference game. ^{#}Rankings from AP Poll. (#) Tournament seedings in parentheses. All times are in Eastern.
