= 2020–21 Presbyterian Blue Hose men's basketball team =

American college basketball season

2020–21 Presbyterian Blue Hose men's basketball
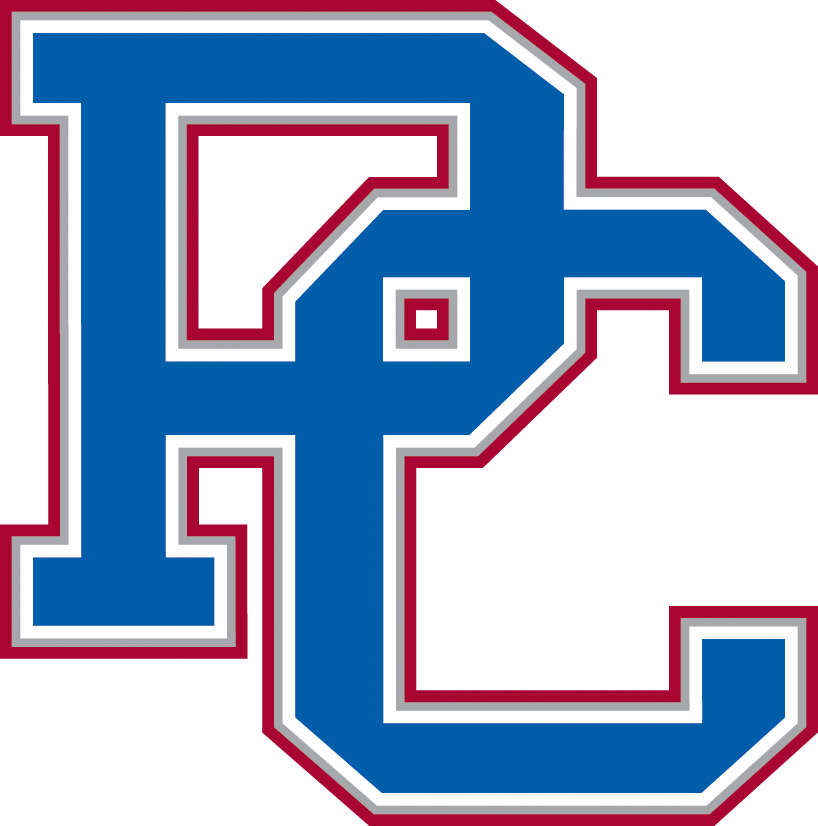
- Conference: Big South Conference
- Record: 7–15 (5–12 Big South)
- Head coach: Quinton Ferrell (2nd season)
- Assistant coaches: Ben Korren; Trey Meyer; Nick Lagroone
- Home arena: Templeton Physical Education Center

2020–21 Big South men's basketball standings
	Conf.				Overall
Team	W		L	PCT	W		L	PCT
Winthrop †	17	–	1	.944	23	–	2	.920
Radford	12	–	6	.667	15	–	12	.556
Campbell	11	–	6	.647	17	–	10	.630
UNC Asheville	9	–	5	.643	10	–	10	.500
Longwood	10	–	10	.500	12	–	17	.414
Gardner–Webb	10	–	10	.500	11	–	15	.423
Hampton	9	–	9	.500	11	–	14	.440
High Point	6	–	11	.353	9	–	15	.375
USC Upstate	5	–	11	.313	5	–	18	.217
Presbyterian	5	–	12	.294	7	–	15	.318
Charleston Southern	2	–	15	.118	3	–	18	.143
† 2021 Big South tournament winner Charleston Southern suspended their season on February 23, 2021.

The 2020–21 Presbyterian Blue Hose men's basketball team represented Presbyterian College during the 2020–21 NCAA Division I men's basketball season. The team was led by second-year head coach Quinton Ferrell, and played their home games at Templeton Physical Education Center in Clinton, South Carolina as members of the Big South Conference.

== Previous season ==
The Blue Hose finished the 2019–20 season 10–22, 7–11 in Big South play, to finish in a three-way tie for seventh place. They lost in the first round of the Big South tournament to Charleston Southern.

== Roster ==
2020–21 Presbyterian Blue Hose men's basketball team
Players
Coaches

Pos.	#	Name	Height	Weight	Year	Hometown
G	0	Rayshon Harrison	6 ft 4 in (1.93 m)	180 lb (82 kg)	Fr	Greenville, SC
G	1	Michael Isler	6 ft 4 in (1.93 m)	190 lb (86 kg)	So	Albany, GA
F	2	Kirshon Thrash	6 ft 3 in (1.91 m)	215 lb (98 kg)	Fr	McDonough, GA
G/F	3	Kobe Stewart	6 ft 6 in (1.98 m)	180 lb (82 kg)	Fr	Augusta, GA
F	4	Winston Hill	6 ft 7 in (2.01 m)	230 lb (104 kg)	Jr	Columbia, SC
G	5	Zeb Graham	6 ft 0 in (1.83 m)	175 lb (79 kg)	So	Fort Mill, SC
G	10	Sean Jenkins	6 ft 4 in (1.93 m)	190 lb (86 kg)	So	Spartanburg, SC
C	11	Will Ferguson	6 ft 8 in (2.03 m)	210 lb (95 kg)	Jr	Yulee, FL
F	12	Giancarlo Sanches	6 ft 8 in (2.03 m)	215 lb (98 kg)	Fr	Sharpsburg, GA
G	13	Tristen Becker	6 ft 3 in (1.91 m)	190 lb (86 kg)	RS Sr	Chicago, IL
F	15	Owen McCormack	6 ft 9 in (2.06 m)	230 lb (104 kg)	So	Advance, NC
G	20	Will Garvey	6 ft 3 in (1.91 m)	185 lb (84 kg)	Fr	Marietta, GA
G	22	Brandon Younger	6 ft 7 in (2.01 m)	190 lb (86 kg)	Jr	Marietta, GA
G	23	Trevon Reddish	6 ft 4 in (1.93 m)	205 lb (93 kg)	So	Carrollton, GA
G	24	Ambaka Le Gregam	6 ft 4 in (1.93 m)	180 lb (82 kg)	Fr	Nairobi, Kenya
F	33	Jack McMahon	6 ft 3 in (1.91 m)	215 lb (98 kg)	So	Hickory, NC

Head coach

- Quinton Ferrell (Presbyterian)

Assistant coach(es)

- Ben Korren (College of Charleston)
- Trey Meyer (Clemson)
- Nick Lagroone (Southern Wesleyan)

Legend

- (C) Team captain
- (S) Suspended
- (I) Ineligible
- (W) Walk-on
- Injured
- Current redshirt

Roster
Last update: December 15, 2020

== Schedule and results ==
Date time, TV	Rank^{#}	Opponent^{#}	Result	Record	Site (attendance) city, state
Regular season
December 2, 2020*; 7:00 p.m., ESPN+		at Jacksonville	L 65–78	0–1	Swisher Gymnasium (180); Jacksonville, FL
December 14, 2020*; 6:00 p.m., ESPN+		Carver	W 85–46	1–1	Templeton Physical Education Center (25); Clinton, SC
December 18, 2020*; 6:00 p.m., ESPN+		South Carolina State	W 62–56	2–1	Templeton Physical Education Center (15); Clinton, SC
December 22, 2020*; 3:00 p.m., ESPN+		at The Citadel	L 84–92	2–2	McAlister Field House (784); Charleston, SC
December 30, 2020; 5:00 p.m., ESPN+		Radford	L 65–71	2–3 (0–1)	Templeton Physical Education Center (5); Clinton, SC
December 31, 2020; 3:00 p.m., ESPN+		Radford	W 65–63	3–3 (1–1)	Templeton Physical Education Center (7); Clinton, SC
January 14, 2021; 7:00 p.m., ESPN+		at Campbell	L 46–48	3–4 (1–2)	John W. Pope Jr. Convocation Center; Buies Creek, NC
January 15, 2021; 7:00 p.m., ESPN+		at Campbell	L 51–73	3–5 (1–3)	John W. Pope Jr. Convocation Center; Buies Creek, NC
January 19, 2021; 6:00 p.m., ESPNU		Winthrop	L 58–72	3–6 (1–4)	Templeton Physical Education Center (20); Clinton, SC
January 20, 2021; 5:00 p.m., ESPN+		Winthrop	L 66–78	3–7 (1–5)	Templeton Physical Education Center (15); Clinton, SC
January 24, 2021; 2:00 p.m., ESPN+		at High Point	L 57–81	3–8 (1–6)	Millis Center; High Point, NC
January 25, 2021; 6:00 p.m., ESPN+		at High Point	W 71–56	4–8 (2–6)	Millis Center; High Point, NC
January 29, 2021; 6:00 p.m., ESPN+		Longwood	L 45–49	4–9 (2–7)	Templeton Physical Education Center (6); Clinton, SC
January 30, 2021; 4:00 p.m., ESPN+		Longwood	W 66–54	5–9 (3–7)	Templeton Physical Education Center (4); Clinton, SC
February 4, 2021; 6:00 p.m.		at Gardner–Webb	L 53–59	5–10 (3–8)	Paul Porter Arena; Boiling Springs, NC
February 5, 2021; 6:00 p.m.		at Gardner–Webb	L 64–91	5–11 (3–9)	Paul Porter Arena; Boiling Springs, NC
February 11, 2021; 6:00 p.m.		at Hampton	W 85–70	6–11 (4–9)	Hampton Convocation Center; Hampton, VA
February 12, 2021; 4:00 p.m., ESPN+		at Hampton	L 57–62	6–12 (4–10)	Hampton Convocation Center; Hampton, VA
February 15, 2021; 7:00 p.m., ESPN+		USC Upstate	W 75–65	7–12 (5–10)	Templeton Physical Education Center (3); Clinton, SC
February 18, 2021; 7:00 p.m., ESPN+		USC Upstate	L 51–65	7–13 (5–11)	Templeton Physical Education Center (6); Clinton, SC
February 22, 2021; 7:00 p.m., ESPN+		Charleston Southern	L 77–78 ^{OT}	7–14 (5–12)	Templeton Physical Education Center (5); Clinton, SC
Big South tournament
February 27, 2021; 2:00 p.m., ESPN3	(10)	at (7) Hampton; First round	L 65–67	7–15	Hampton Convocation Center; Hampton, VA
*Non-conference game. ^{#}Rankings from AP poll. (#) Tournament seedings in parentheses. All times are in Eastern.
