= 2020–21 Gardner–Webb Runnin' Bulldogs men's basketball team =

American college basketball season

2020–21 Gardner–Webb Runnin' Bulldogs men's basketball
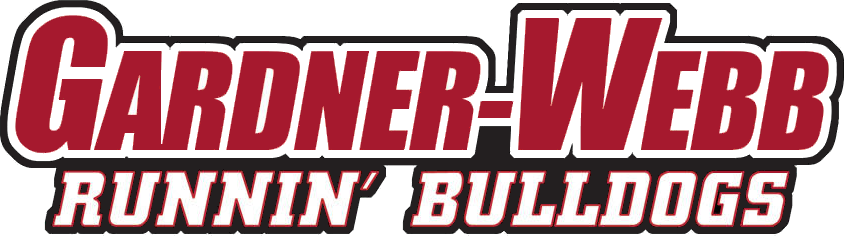
- Conference: Big South Conference
- Record: 11–15 (10–10 Big South)
- Head coach: Tim Craft (8th season)
- Assistant coaches: Jeremy Luther; Jake DeLaney; Andrew Brown
- Home arena: Paul Porter Arena

2020–21 Big South men's basketball standings
	Conf.				Overall
Team	W		L	PCT	W		L	PCT
Winthrop †	17	–	1	.944	23	–	2	.920
Radford	12	–	6	.667	15	–	12	.556
Campbell	11	–	6	.647	17	–	10	.630
UNC Asheville	9	–	5	.643	10	–	10	.500
Longwood	10	–	10	.500	12	–	17	.414
Gardner–Webb	10	–	10	.500	11	–	15	.423
Hampton	9	–	9	.500	11	–	14	.440
High Point	6	–	11	.353	9	–	15	.375
USC Upstate	5	–	11	.313	5	–	18	.217
Presbyterian	5	–	12	.294	7	–	15	.318
Charleston Southern	2	–	15	.118	3	–	18	.143
† 2021 Big South tournament winner Charleston Southern suspended their season on February 23, 2021.

The 2020–21 Gardner–Webb Runnin' Bulldogs men's basketball team represented Gardner–Webb University in the 2020–21 NCAA Division I men's basketball season. The Runnin' Bulldogs, led by eighth-year head coach Tim Craft, played their home games at the Paul Porter Arena in Boiling Springs, North Carolina as members of the Big South Conference.

== Previous season ==
The Runnin' Bulldogs finished the 2019–20 season 16–16, 11–7 in Big South play, to finish in third place. They defeated UNC Asheville in the quarterfinals of the Big South tournament before losing in the semifinals to Winthrop.

== Roster ==
2020–21 Gardner–Webb Runnin' Bulldogs men's basketball team
Players
Coaches

Pos.	#	Name	Height	Weight	Year	Hometown
G	0	Lance Terry	6 ft 2 in (1.88 m)	180 lb (82 kg)	So	College Park, GA
PG	1	Jaheam Cornwall	6 ft 0 in (1.83 m)	175 lb (79 kg)	Sr	Brooklyn, NY
F	2	Jordon Sears	5 ft 11 in (1.8 m)	175 lb (79 kg)	Fr	Daytona Beach, FL
G	4	D'Maurian Williams	6 ft 5 in (1.96 m)	195 lb (88 kg)	Fr	Phoenix, AZ
G	5	Jamaine Mann	6 ft 6 in (1.98 m)	225 lb (102 kg)	Fr	Hampton, GA
G	10	Tyrone Simos-Primerano	6 ft 7 in (2.01 m)	190 lb (86 kg)	RS Fr	Melbourne, Australia
F	14	Kareem Reid	6 ft 9 in (2.06 m)	205 lb (93 kg)	So	Queens, NY
G	23	Anthony Selden	6 ft 6 in (1.98 m)	220 lb (100 kg)	RS Fr	Boston, MA
F	24	Ludovic Dufael	6 ft 8 in (2.03 m)	220 lb (100 kg)	RS Jr	Saint-Joseph, Martinique
C	25	Sammy Itodo	6 ft 8 in (2.03 m)	210 lb (95 kg)	RS Fr	Kaduna, Nigeria
F	32	Christian Alexander	6 ft 8 in (2.03 m)	240 lb (109 kg)	Jr	Sherborne (Dorset), England

Head coach

- Tim Craft (Florida)

Assistant coach(es)

- Jeremy Luther (North Greenville)
- Jake DeLaney (Gardner–Webb)
- Andrew Brown (Mercer)

Legend

- (C) Team captain
- (S) Suspended
- (I) Ineligible
- (W) Walk-on
- Injured
- Current redshirt

Roster
Last update: March 20, 2021

== Schedule and results ==
Date time, TV	Rank^{#}	Opponent^{#}	Result	Record	Site (attendance) city, state
Non-conference regular season
December 10, 2020*; 7:00 p.m., ESPN+		at Western Kentucky	L 84–86	0–1	E. A. Diddle Arena (1,009); Bowling Green, KY
December 12, 2020*; 4:00 p.m., ACCNX		at Pittsburgh	L 50–67	0–2	Petersen Events Center; Pittsburgh, PA
December 15, 2020*; 9:00 p.m., ESPN+		at East Tennessee State	L 60–65	0–3	Freedom Hall Civic Center (105); Johnson City, TN
December 18, 2020*; 12:00 p.m., ESPN+		VMI	W 88–77	1–3	Paul Porter Arena; Boiling Springs, NC
December 21, 2020*; 8:00 p.m., ACCRSN		at No. 21 Florida State	L 59–72	1–4	Donald L. Tucker Civic Center (2,078); Tallahassee, FL
Big South Conference regular season
December 30, 2020; 2:00 p.m., ESPN+		at Hampton	L 69–80	1–5 (0–1)	Hampton Convocation Center; Hampton, VA
December 31, 2020; 12:00 p.m., ESPN+		at Hampton	W 80–69	2–5 (1–1)	Hampton Convocation Center; Hampton, VA
January 4, 2021; 5:00 p.m., ESPN+		Campbell	L 61–70	2–6 (1–2)	Paul Porter Arena; Boiling Springs, NC
January 5, 2021; 3:00 p.m., ESPN+		Campbell	W 85–70	3–6 (2–2)	Paul Porter Arena; Boiling Springs, NC
January 9, 2021; 1:00 p.m., ESPN+		at Winthrop	L 75–85	3–7 (2–3)	Winthrop Coliseum; Rock Hill, SC
January 10, 2021; 1:00 p.m., ESPN+		at Winthrop	L 83–91	3–8 (2–4)	Winthrop Coliseum; Rock Hill, SC
January 19, 2021; 7:00 p.m., ESPN+		UNC Asheville	L 75–79	3–9 (2–5)	Paul Porter Arena; Boiling Springs, NC
January 20, 2021; 7:00 p.m., ESPN+		UNC Asheville	W 84–57	4–9 (3–5)	Paul Porter Arena; Boiling Springs, NC
January 24, 2021; 2:00 p.m., ESPN+		Charleston Southern	W 74–62	5–9 (4–5)	Paul Porter Arena; Boiling Springs, NC
January 25, 2021; 2:00 p.m., ESPN+		Charleston Southern	W 80–71	6–9 (5–5)	Paul Porter Arena; Boiling Springs, NC
January 29, 2021; 7:00 p.m., ESPN+		High Point	L 55–59	6–10 (5–6)	Paul Porter Arena; Boiling Springs, NC
January 30, 2021; 5:00 p.m., ESPN+		High Point	L 69–72	6–11 (5–7)	Paul Porter Arena; Boiling Springs, NC
February 4, 2021		Presbyterian	W 59–53	7–11 (6–7)	Paul Porter Arena; Boiling Springs, NC
February 5, 2021		Presbyterian	W 91–64	8–11 (7–7)	Paul Porter Arena; Boiling Springs, NC
February 8, 2021		at USC Upstate	L 69–77	8–12 (7–8)	G.B. Hodge Center; Valley Falls, S.C.
February 11, 2021		at Longwood	L 54–57	8–13 (7–9)	Willett Hall; Farmville, VA
February 12, 2021; 6:00 p.m., ESPN+		at Longwood	L 71–78	8–14 (7–10)	Willett Hall; Farmville, VA
February 17, 2021; 6:00 p.m., ESPN+		at Radford	W 69–57	9–14 (8–10)	Dedmon Center; Radford, VA
February 18, 2021; 6:00 p.m., ESPN+		at Radford	W 77–49	10–14 (9–10)	Dedmon Center; Radford, VA
February 23, 2021; 6:00 p.m., ESPN+		at USC Upstate	W 69–58	11–14 (10–10)	G. B. Hodge Center; Spartanburg, SC
Big South tournament
March 1, 2021; 7:00 p.m., ESPN3	(6)	at (3) Campbell; Quarterfinals	L 57–63	11–15	Gore Arena; Buies Creek, NC
*Non-conference game. ^{#}Rankings from AP poll. (#) Tournament seedings in parentheses. All times are in Eastern.
