= 2020–21 Charleston Southern Buccaneers men's basketball team =

American college basketball season

2020–21 Charleston Southern Buccaneers men's basketball
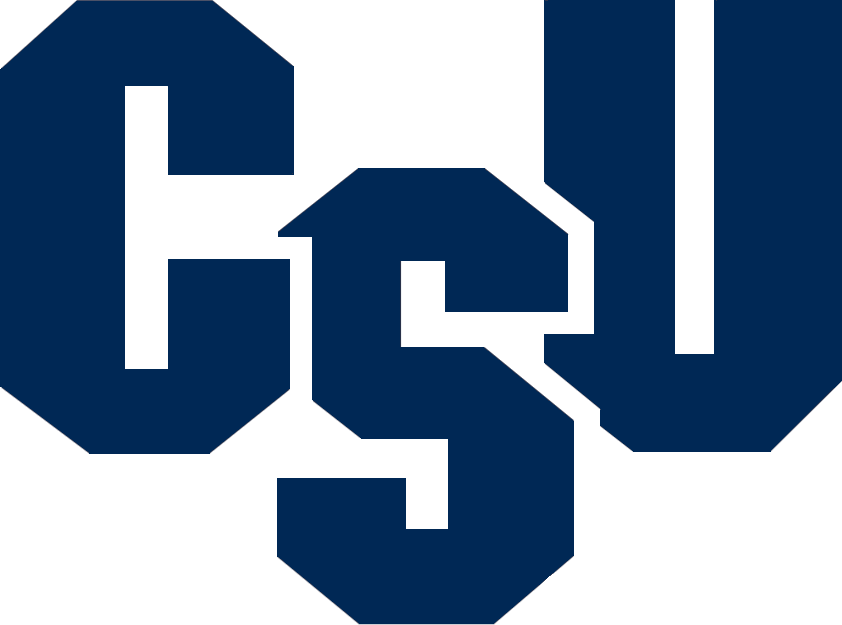
- Conference: Big South Conference
- Record: 3–18 (2–15 Big South)
- Head coach: Barclay Radebaugh (16th season)
- Assistant coaches: Rick Duckett; Thomas Butters; Saah Nimley
- Home arena: Buccaneer Field House

2020–21 Big South men's basketball standings
| | Conf. | | | | Overall |
| Team | W | | L | PCT | W | | L | PCT |
|---|---|---|---|---|---|---|---|---|
| Winthrop † | 17 | – | 1 | .944 | 23 | – | 2 | .920 |
| Radford | 12 | – | 6 | .667 | 15 | – | 12 | .556 |
| Campbell | 11 | – | 6 | .647 | 17 | – | 10 | .630 |
| UNC Asheville | 9 | – | 5 | .643 | 10 | – | 10 | .500 |
| Longwood | 10 | – | 10 | .500 | 12 | – | 17 | .414 |
| Gardner–Webb | 10 | – | 10 | .500 | 11 | – | 15 | .423 |
| Hampton | 9 | – | 9 | .500 | 11 | – | 14 | .440 |
| High Point | 6 | – | 11 | .353 | 9 | – | 15 | .375 |
| USC Upstate | 5 | – | 11 | .313 | 5 | – | 18 | .217 |
| Presbyterian | 5 | – | 12 | .294 | 7 | – | 15 | .318 |
| Charleston Southern | 2 | – | 15 | .118 | 3 | – | 18 | .143 |
† 2021 Big South tournament winner Charleston Southern suspended their season on February 23, 2021.

The 2020–21 Charleston Southern Buccaneers men's basketball team represented Charleston Southern University in the 2020–21 NCAA Division I men's basketball season. The Buccaneers, led by 16th-year head coach Barclay Radebaugh, play their home games at the Buccaneer Field House in North Charleston, South Carolina as members of the Big South Conference.

On February 23, 2021, Charleston Southern canceled the remainder of their season due to COVID-19 pandemic considerations. They finished the year with a 3–18 overall record (2–15 conference) and 11th place out of 11 Big South teams.

== Previous season ==
The Buccaneers finished the 2019–20 season 14–18, 7–11 in Big South play to finish in a three-way tie for seventh place. They defeated Presbyterian in the first round of the Big South tournament before losing in the quarterfinals to Radford.

== Roster ==
2020–21 Charleston Southern Buccaneers men's basketball team
Players
Coaches

| Pos. | # | Name | Height | Weight | Year | Hometown |
|---|---|---|---|---|---|---|
| G | 0 | Travis Anderson | 6 ft 0 in (1.83 m) | 175 lb (79 kg) | RS So | Atlanta, Georgia |
| F | 1 | Terence Jr. Porter | 6 ft 8 in (2.03 m) | 200 lb (91 kg) | RS Fr | Atlanta, Georgia |
| G | 2 | Emorie Knox | 6 ft 0 in (1.83 m) | 170 lb (77 kg) | Fr | Myrtle Beach, South Carolina |
| G | 4 | Deontaye Buskey | 6 ft 1 in (1.85 m) | 160 lb (73 kg) | Sr | Daphne, Alabama |
| F | 5 | Melvin Jr. Edwards | 6 ft 6 in (1.98 m) | 195 lb (88 kg) | Fr | Carrollton, Georgia |
| G/F | 10 | Jamir Moore | 6 ft 5 in (1.96 m) | 200 lb (91 kg) | RS So | Miramar, Florida |
| G | 11 | Ja'Quavian Florence | 6 ft 4 in (1.93 m) | 200 lb (91 kg) | Fr | Atlanta, Georgia |
| F | 12 | Ty Jones | 6 ft 6 in (1.98 m) | 250 lb (113 kg) | Sr | Pontotoc, Mississippi |
| C | 22 | Sadarius Bowser | 6 ft 9 in (2.06 m) | 230 lb (104 kg) | Jr | Gaffney, South Carolina |
| G | 23 | Sean Price | 6 ft 3 in (1.91 m) | 200 lb (91 kg) | RS Jr | Port Charlotte, Florida |
| G | 24 | Phlandrous Jr. Fleming | 6 ft 4 in (1.93 m) | 210 lb (95 kg) | Sr | Athens, Georgia |
| G | 50 | Malik Battle | 6 ft 3 in (1.91 m) | 180 lb (82 kg) | So | Atlanta, Georgia |

Head coach

- Barclay Radebaugh (East Tennessee State)

Assistant coach(es)

- Rick Duckett (North Carolina)
- Thomas Butters (Clemson)
- Saah Nimley (Charleston Southern)

Legend

- (C) Team captain
- (S) Suspended
- (I) Ineligible
- (W) Walk-on
- Injured
- Current redshirt

Roster
Last update: December 17, 2020

== Schedule and results ==
| Date time, TV | Rank^{#} | Opponent^{#} | Result | Record | Site (attendance) city, state |
Regular season
| November 25, 2020*; 8:00 pm, ACCN | | at NC State; Mako Medical Wolfpack Invitational | L 61–95 | 0–1 | Reynolds Coliseum (25); Raleigh, SC |
| November 27, 2020*; 2:00 pm | | vs. Eastern Kentucky; Mako Medical Wolfpack Invitational | L 50–60 | 0–2 | Reynolds Center; Raleigh, NC |
| December 1, 2020*; 7:00 pm, ESPN+ | | North Carolina A&T | L 63–70 | 0–3 | Buccaneer Field House (32); North Charleston, SC |
| December 8, 2020*; 7:00 pm, ESPN+ | | Carver | W 94–59 | 1–3 | Buccaneer Field House (9); North Charleston, SC |
| December 21, 2020; 7:00 pm, ESPN+ | | Hampton | L 55–67 | 1–4 (0–1) | Buccaneer Field House (38); North Charleston, SC |
| December 22, 2020; 6:00 pm, ESPN+ | | Hampton | L 68–70 | 1–5 (0–2) | Buccaneer Field House (38); North Charleston, SC |
| January 4, 2021; 4:00 pm, ESPN+ | | Winthrop | L 69–85 | 1–6 (0–3) | Buccaneer Field House (36); North Charleston, SC |
| January 5, 2021; 3:00 pm, ESPN+ | | Winthrop | L 76–78 | 1–7 (0–4) | Paul Porter Arena (24); Boiling Springs, NC |
| January 9, 2021; 5:00 pm, ESPN+ | | Radford | L 64–79 | 1–8 (0–5) | Buccaneer Field House; North Charleston, SC |
| January 10, 2021; 3:00 pm, ESPN+ | | Radford | L 48–68 | 1–9 (0–6) | Buccaneer Field House; North Charleston, SC |
| January 14, 2021; 4:00 pm, ESPN+ | | at UNC Asheville | L 54–92 | 1–10 (0–7) | Kimmel Arena; Asheville, NC |
| January 15, 2021; 2:00 pm, ESPN3 | | at UNC Asheville | L 75–83 | 1–11 (0–8) | Kimmel Arena; Asheville, NC |
| January 24, 2021; 2:00 pm, ESPN+ | | at Gardner–Webb | L 62–74 | 1–12 (0–9) | Paul Porter Arena; Boiling Springs, NC |
| January 25, 2021; 4:00 pm, ESPN+ | | at Gardner–Webb | L 71–80 | 1–13 (0–10) | Paul Porter Arena; Boiling Springs, NC |
| January 29, 2021; 7:30 pm, ESPN+ | | at Campbell | L 58–59 | 1–14 (0–11) | Gore Arena; Buies Creek, NC |
| January 30, 2021; 5:30 pm, ESPN+ | | at Campbell | L 67–75 | 1–15 (0–12) | Gore Arena; Buies Creek, NC |
| February 4, 2021; 6:00 pm, ESPN+ | | Longwood | Postponed | | Buccaneer Field House; North Charleston, SC |
| February 5, 2021; 4:00 pm, ESPN+ | | Longwood | Postponed | | Buccaneer Field House; North Charleston, SC |
| February 11, 2021; 6:00 pm, ESPN+ | | at High Point | L 73–77 | 1–16 (0–13) | Millis Center; High Point, NC |
| February 12, 2021; 6:00 pm, ESPN+ | | at High Point | W 69–68 | 2–16 (1–13) | Millis Center; High Point, NC |
| February 18, 2021; 7:00 pm, ESPN+ | | USC Upstate | L 62–70 | 2–17 (1–14) | Buccaneer Field House; North Charleston, SC |
| February 19, 2021; 6:00 pm, ESPN+ | | USC Upstate | L 58–64 | 2–18 (1–15) | Buccaneer Field House; North Charleston, SC |
| February 22, 2021; 6:00 pm, ESPN+ | | at Presbyterian | W 78–77 | 3–18 (2–15) | Templeton Physical Education Center; Clinton, SC |
*Non-conference game. ^{#}Rankings from AP Poll. (#) Tournament seedings in parentheses. All times are in Eastern.
