= 2020–21 USC Upstate Spartans men's basketball team =

American college basketball season

2020–21 USC Upstate Spartans men's basketball
- Conference: Big South Conference
- Record: 5–18 (5–11 Big South)
- Head coach: Dave Dickerson (3rd season)
- Assistant coaches: Ron Bradley; Stacey Palmore; Andrew Garcia
- Home arena: G. B. Hodge Center

2020–21 Big South men's basketball standings
	Conf.				Overall
Team	W		L	PCT	W		L	PCT
Winthrop †	17	–	1	.944	23	–	2	.920
Radford	12	–	6	.667	15	–	12	.556
Campbell	11	–	6	.647	17	–	10	.630
UNC Asheville	9	–	5	.643	10	–	10	.500
Longwood	10	–	10	.500	12	–	17	.414
Gardner–Webb	10	–	10	.500	11	–	15	.423
Hampton	9	–	9	.500	11	–	14	.440
High Point	6	–	11	.353	9	–	15	.375
USC Upstate	5	–	11	.313	5	–	18	.217
Presbyterian	5	–	12	.294	7	–	15	.318
Charleston Southern	2	–	15	.118	3	–	18	.143
† 2021 Big South tournament winner Charleston Southern suspended their season on February 23, 2021.

The 2020–21 USC Upstate Spartans men's basketball team represented University of South Carolina Upstate during the 2020–21 NCAA Division I men's basketball season. The team was led by third-year head coach Dave Dickerson, and played their home games at G. B. Hodge Center in Spartanburg, South Carolina as members of the Big South Conference.

== Previous season ==
The Spartans finished the 2019–20 season 13–20, 7–11 in Big South play, to finish in a three-way tie for seventh place. They defeated High Point in the first round of the Big South tournament, before losing in the quarterfinals to Winthrop.

== Roster ==
2020–21 USC Upstate Spartans men's basketball team
Players
Coaches

Pos.	#	Name	Height	Weight	Year	Previous school	Hometown
F	0	Brandon Martin	6 ft 5 in (1.96 m)	220 lb (100 kg)	Jr	Cardinal Newman High School	Miami, FL
G	1	Dalvin White	5 ft 10 in (1.78 m)	170 lb (77 kg)	Jr	Norcross High School	Norcross, GA
G	2	Cartier Jernigan	6 ft 1 in (1.85 m)	180 lb (82 kg)	So	West Charlotte High School	Charlotte, NC
G	3	Mysta Goodloe	6 ft 4 in (1.93 m)	195 lb (88 kg)	So	R. J. Reynolds High School	Winston-Salem, NC
F	4	Khydarius Smith	6 ft 8 in (2.03 m)	210 lb (95 kg)	So	Nation Ford High School	Fort Mill, SC
G/F	5	Bryson Mozone	6 ft 6 in (1.98 m)	200 lb (91 kg)	Jr	North Augusta High School	North Augusta, SC
G	10	Tommy Bruner	6 ft 1 in (1.85 m)	175 lb (79 kg)	So	Gray Collegiate Academy	Columbia, SC
G	12	Everette Hammond	6 ft 3 in (1.91 m)	190 lb (86 kg)	Jr	St. Thomas More School	Silver Spring, MD
G/F	13	Quentin Hodge	6 ft 5 in (1.96 m)	180 lb (82 kg)	Fr	Lakewood High School	Sumter, SC
G/F	21	Khavon Moore	6 ft 8 in (2.03 m)	220 lb (100 kg)	RS So	Clemson	Macon, GA
G	22	Thomas Sheida	6 ft 1 in (1.85 m)	185 lb (84 kg)	RS Fr	Cardinal Newman High School	Bundaberg, Australia
G/F	23	Dave III Dickerson	6 ft 4 in (1.93 m)	205 lb (93 kg)	RS Fr	Dorman High School	Inman, SC
F	25	Jatayveous Watson	6 ft 8 in (2.03 m)	220 lb (100 kg)	So	Newnan High School	Newnan, GA
G/F	34	Josh Aldrich	6 ft 7 in (2.01 m)	205 lb (93 kg)	Jr	New Hanover High School	Wilmington, NC
C	35	Nevin Zink	6 ft 9 in (2.06 m)	230 lb (104 kg)	Jr	St. Andrew's School	Newtown, CT

Head coach

- Dave Dickerson (Maryland)

Assistant coach(es)

- Ron Bradley (Eastern Nazarene)
- Stacey Palmore (Livingston)
- Andrew Garcia (Tulane)

Legend

- (C) Team captain
- (S) Suspended
- (I) Ineligible
- (W) Walk-on
- Injured
- Current redshirt

Roster
Last update: December 3, 2020

== Schedule and results ==
Date time, TV	Rank^{#}	Opponent^{#}	Result	Record	Site (attendance) city, state
Regular season
November 25, 2020*; 2:00 p.m., ESPN+		Southern Wesleyan	L 72–82	0–1	G. B. Hodge Center (40); Spartanburg, SC
November 28, 2020*; 2:00 p.m., ESPN+		at Furman	L 63–91	0–2	Timmons Arena (250); Greenville, SC
December 2, 2020*; 5:30 p.m., ESPN+		Eastern Kentucky	L 78–95	0–3	G. B. Hodge Center (142); Spartanburg, SC
December 5, 2020*; 6:00 p.m., ESPN+		Georgia Southern	L 69–72	0–4	G. B. Hodge Center (140); Spartanburg, SC
December 12, 2020; 4:00 p.m., WYCW		Winthrop	L 77–95	0–5 (0–1)	G. B. Hodge Center (140); Spartanburg, SC
December 13, 2020; 2:00 p.m., WYCW		Winthrop	L 77–107	0–6 (0–2)	G. B. Hodge Center (140); Spartanburg, SC
December 15, 2020*; 7:00 p.m., ESPN+		at UNC Greensboro	L 57–65	0–7	Greensboro Coliseum; Greensboro, NC
December 23, 2020*; 5:00 p.m., SECN		at No. 8 Tennessee	L 60–80	0–8	Thompson–Boling Arena (4,191); Knoxville, TN
December 30, 2020; 6:00 p.m., ESPN+		at High Point	L 52–63	0–9 (0–3)	Millis Center; High Point, NC
December 31, 2020; 6:00 p.m., ESPN+		at High Point	W 60–51	1–9 (1–3)	Millis Center; High Point, NC
January 4, 2021; 6:00 p.m., ESPN+		Longwood	W 71–69	2–9 (2–3)	G. B. Hodge Center (140); Spartanburg, SC
January 5, 2021; 6:00 p.m., ESPN+		Longwood	W 65–59	3–9 (3–3)	G. B. Hodge Center (140); Spartanburg, SC
January 14, 2021; 6:00 p.m., ESPN+		Hampton	L 68–69	3–10 (3–4)	G. B. Hodge Center (140); Spartanburg, SC
January 15, 2021; 6:00 p.m., ESPN+		Hampton	L 74–84	3–11 (3–5)	G. B. Hodge Center (140); Spartanburg, SC
February 4, 2021; 6:00 p.m., ESPN+		at Radford	L 61–63	3–12 (3–6)	Dedmon Center (250); Radford, VA
February 5, 2021; 6:00 p.m., ESPN+		at Radford	L 66–102	3–13 (3–7)	Dedmon Center (250); Radford, VA
February 8, 2021; 5:00 p.m., WYCW		Gardner–Webb	W 77–69	4–13 (4–7)	G. B. Hodge Center (140); Spartanburg, SC
February 11, 2021; 7:00 p.m., ESPN+		at Campbell	L 71–72	4–14 (4–8)	Gore Arena; Buies Creek, NC
February 12, 2021; 7:00 p.m., ESPN+		at Campbell	L 49–64	4–15 (4–9)	Gore Arena; Buies Creek, NC
February 15, 2021; 6:00 p.m., ESPN+		at Presbyterian	L 65–75	4–16 (4–10)	Templeton Physical Education Center; Clinton, SC
February 18, 2021; 7:00 p.m., ESPN+		at Presbyterian	W 65–51	5–16 (5–10)	Templeton Physical Education Center; Clinton, SC
February 22, 2021; 6:00 p.m., ESPN3		Gardner–Webb	L 58–69	5–17 (5–11)	G. B. Hodge Center; Spartanburg, SC
Big South tournament
February 27, 2021; 4:00 p.m., ESPN3	(9)	at (8) High Point; First round	L 60–65	5–18	Millis Center; High Point, NC
*Non-conference game. ^{#}Rankings from AP poll. (#) Tournament seedings in parentheses. All times are in Eastern.
