= 2020–21 Campbell Fighting Camels men's basketball team =

American college basketball season

2020–21 Campbell Fighting Camels men's basketball
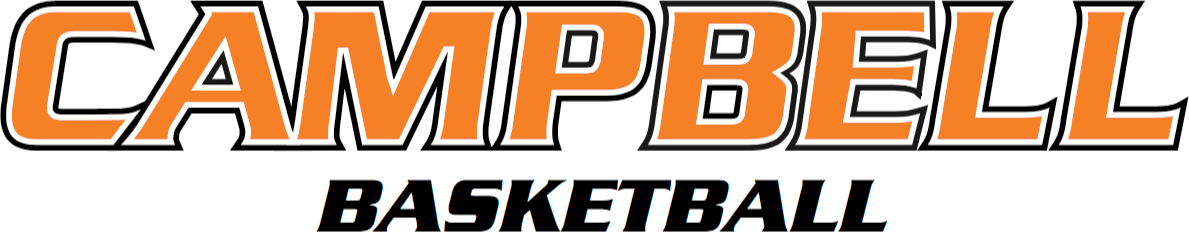
- Conference: Big South Conference
- Record: 17–10 (11–6 Big South)
- Head coach: Kevin McGeehan (8th season)
- Associate head coach: Peter Thomas
- Assistant coaches: Kevin Smith; Kenneth White
- Home arena: Gore Arena

2020–21 Big South men's basketball standings
	Conf.				Overall
Team	W		L	PCT	W		L	PCT
Winthrop †	17	–	1	.944	23	–	2	.920
Radford	12	–	6	.667	15	–	12	.556
Campbell	11	–	6	.647	17	–	10	.630
UNC Asheville	9	–	5	.643	10	–	10	.500
Longwood	10	–	10	.500	12	–	17	.414
Gardner–Webb	10	–	10	.500	11	–	15	.423
Hampton	9	–	9	.500	11	–	14	.440
High Point	6	–	11	.353	9	–	15	.375
USC Upstate	5	–	11	.313	5	–	18	.217
Presbyterian	5	–	12	.294	7	–	15	.318
Charleston Southern	2	–	15	.118	3	–	18	.143
† 2021 Big South tournament winner Charleston Southern suspended their season on February 23, 2021.

The 2020–21 Campbell Fighting Camels men's basketball team represented Campbell University in the 2020–21 NCAA Division I men's basketball season. The Fighting Camels, led by 8th-year head coach Kevin McGeehan, played their home games at Gore Arena in Buies Creek, North Carolina as members of the Big South Conference.

== Previous season ==
The Fighting Camels finished the 2019–20 season 15–16, 6–12 in Big South play to finish in a tie for tenth place. They lost in the first round of the Big South tournament to UNC Asheville.

== Roster ==
2020–21 Campbell Fighting Camels men's basketball team
Players
Coaches

Pos.	#	Name	Height	Weight	Year	Previous school	Hometown
G	0	Gediminas Mokšeckas	6 ft 4 in (1.93 m)	195 lb (88 kg)	Fr	Archbishop Ryan HS	Vilnius, Lithuania
G	1	Ricky Clemons	6 ft 2 in (1.88 m)	205 lb (93 kg)	Jr	Rolesville HS	Rolesville, NC
G	2	PJ Carter	6 ft 5 in (1.96 m)	175 lb (79 kg)	Fr	Langston Hughes HS	Atlanta, GA
G	4	Dray Burton	6 ft 0 in (1.83 m)	180 lb (82 kg)	Fr	Powdersville HS	Greenville, SC
G	5	Messiah Thompson	5 ft 8 in (1.73 m)	165 lb (75 kg)	So	North Atlanta HS	Atlanta, GA
C	10	Milos Stajcic	6 ft 10 in (2.08 m)	240 lb (109 kg)	Jr	Freedom Christian Academy	Belgrade, Serbia
G	11	Jordan Whitfield	6 ft 1 in (1.85 m)	175 lb (79 kg)	Sr	Millbrook HS	Raleigh, NC
F	12	Jesús Carralero	6 ft 8 in (2.03 m)	215 lb (98 kg)	So	Link Year Prep	Málaga, Spain
G	13	Austin McCullough	6 ft 5 in (1.96 m)	205 lb (93 kg)	Sr	City College of San Francisco	Birmingham, AL
G	14	Jaden Kennedy	6 ft 4 in (1.93 m)	180 lb (82 kg)	Fr	Ridge View HS	District Heights, MD
G	15	Eric Blackwell III	6 ft 1 in (1.85 m)	190 lb (86 kg)	Fr	Corona del Sol HS	Phoenix, AZ
G	20	Thomas Dees	6 ft 3 in (1.91 m)	185 lb (84 kg)	Fr	South Johnston HS	Four Oaks, NC
F	21	Duane Moss	6 ft 6 in (1.98 m)	200 lb (91 kg)	RS Jr	Chattanooga	Myrtle Beach, SC
F	22	Laurynas Vaištaras	6 ft 6 in (1.98 m)	210 lb (95 kg)	Fr	Kaunas Varpas	Plungė, Lithuania
F	23	Joshua Lusane	6 ft 7 in (2.01 m)	235 lb (107 kg)	So	Americus-Sumter HS	Americus, GA
G	24	Andrew Carroll	6 ft 3 in (1.91 m)	195 lb (88 kg)	So	Wake Christian Academy	Raleigh, NC
	30	Ethan Lynch	6 ft 2 in (1.88 m)	210 lb (95 kg)	Fr	Bishop Ireton HS	Accokeek, MD
G/F	45	Cedric Henderson Jr.	6 ft 6 in (1.98 m)	190 lb (86 kg)	Jr	SW Tennessee CC	Memphis, TN

Head coach

- Kevin McGeehan (Gettysburg)

Assistant coach(es)

- Peter Thomas (Richmond)
- Kevin Smith (Richmond)
- Kenneth White (North Carolina)

Legend

- (C) Team captain
- (S) Suspended
- (I) Ineligible
- (W) Walk-on
- Injured
- Current redshirt

Roster
Last update: December 13, 2020

== Schedule and results ==
Date time, TV	Rank^{#}	Opponent^{#}	Result	Record	Site (attendance) city, state
Non-conference regular season
November 30, 2020*; 5:00 pm, ESPN+		St. Andrews	W 85–51	1–0	Gore Arena; Buies Creek, NC
December 8, 2020*; 7:00 pm, ESPN+		at Jacksonville; BSN Sports Dolphin Classic	W 80–78	2–0	Swisher Gymnasium (180); Jacksonville, FL
December 9, 2020*; 2:30 pm, YouTube Live		vs. New Orleans; BSN Sports Dolphin Classic	W 79–70	3–0	Swisher Gymnasium (38); Jacksonville, FL
December 10, 2020*; 1:00 pm, YouTube Live		vs. Florida National; BSN Sports Dolphin Classic	W 122–92	4–0	Swisher Gymnasium (37); Jacksonville, FL
December 16, 2020*; 3:00 pm, FloHoops		at Elon	L 56–66	4–1	Schar Center; Elon, NC
December 19, 2020*; ACCN		at NC State	L 50–69	4–2	PNC Arena; Raleigh, NC
December 21, 2020*; 1:00 pm, ESPN+		UNC Wilmington	L 59–78	4–3	Gore Arena; Buies Creek, NC
Big South Conference regular season
December 30, 2020; 3:00 pm, ESPN+		at Winthrop	L 83–84	4–4 (0–1)	Winthrop Coliseum; Rock Hill, SC
December 31, 2020; 1:00 pm, ESPN+		at Winthrop	L 76–94	4–5 (0–2)	Winthrop Coliseum; Rock Hill, SC
January 4, 2021; 5:00 pm, ESPN+		at Gardner–Webb	W 70–61	5–5 (1–2)	Paul Porter Arena; Boiling Springs, NC
January 5, 2021; 3:00 pm, ESPN+		at Gardner–Webb	L 70–85	5–6 (1–3)	Paul Porter Arena; Boiling Springs, NC
January 9, 2021; 6:00 pm, ESPN+		at Longwood	W 64–58	6–6 (2–3)	Willett Hall; Farmville, VA
January 10, 2021; 6:00 pm, ESPN+		at Longwood	L 69–78	6–7 (2–4)	Willett Hall; Farmville, VA
January 14, 2021; 7:00 pm, ESPN+		Presbyterian	W 48–46	7–7 (3–4)	Gore Arena; Buies Creek, NC
January 15, 2021; 7:00 pm, ESPN+		Presbyterian	W 73–51	8–7 (4–4)	Gore Arena; Buies Creek, NC
January 19, 2021; 7:00 pm, ESPN+		Radford	L 91–97 ^{3OT}	8–8 (4–5)	Gore Arena; Buies Creek, NC
January 20, 2021; 7:00 pm, ESPN+		Radford	L 61–67	8–9 (4–6)	Gore Arena; Buies Creek, NC
January 29, 2021; 7:30 pm, ESPN+		Charleston Southern	W 59–58	9–9 (5–6)	Gore Arena; Buies Creek, NC
January 30, 2021; 5:30 pm, ESPN+		Charleston Southern	W 75–67	10–9 (6–6)	Gore Arena; Buies Creek, NC
February 4, 2021; 4:00 pm, ESPNU		at UNC Asheville	Canceled		Kimmel Arena; Asheville, NC
February 5, 2021; 2:00 pm, ESPN+		at UNC Asheville	Canceled		Kimmel Arena; Asheville, NC
February 11, 2021; 7:00 pm, ESPN+		USC Upstate	W 72–71	11–9 (7–6)	Gore Arena; Buies Creek, NC
February 12, 2021; 7:00 pm, ESPN+		USC Upstate	W 64–49	12–9 (8–6)	Gore Arena; Buies Creek, NC
February 18, 2021; 6:00 pm, ESPN+		at Hampton	W 76–57	13–9 (9–6)	Hampton Convocation Center; Hampton, VA
February 19, 2021; 6:00 pm, ESPN+		at Hampton	W 73–68	14–9 (10–6)	Hampton Convocation Center; Hampton, VA
February 23, 2021; 7:00 pm, ESPN+		High Point	W 68–48	15–9 (11–6)	Gore Arena; Buies Creek, NC
Big South tournament
March 1, 2020; 7:00 pm, ESPN3	(3)	(6) Gardner–Webb; Quarterfinals	W 63–57	16–9	Gore Arena; Buies Creek, NC
March 4, 2020; 8:00 pm, ESPN+	(3)	at (2) Radford; Semifinals	W 78–60	17–9	Dedmon Center; Radford, VA
March 7, 2020; 12:00 pm, ESPN	(3)	at (1) Winthrop; Championship	L 53–80	17–10	Winthrop Coliseum; Rock Hill, SC
*Non-conference game. ^{#}Rankings from AP Poll. (#) Tournament seedings in parentheses. All times are in Eastern.
