= 2020–21 Hampton Pirates basketball team =

American college basketball season

2020–21 Hampton Pirates men's basketball
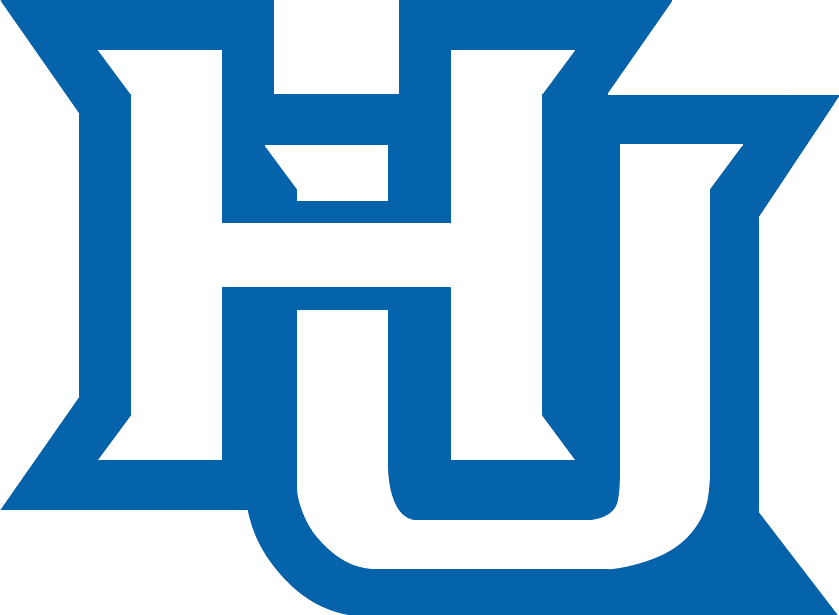
- Conference: Big South Conference
- Record: 11–14 (9–9 Big South)
- Head coach: Edward Joyner Jr. (12th season)
- Associate head coach: Darryl Sharp
- Assistant coaches: Matthew Hamilton; Keith Coutreyer
- Home arena: Hampton Convocation Center

2020–21 Big South men's basketball standings
	Conf.				Overall
Team	W		L	PCT	W		L	PCT
Winthrop †	17	–	1	.944	23	–	2	.920
Radford	12	–	6	.667	15	–	12	.556
Campbell	11	–	6	.647	17	–	10	.630
UNC Asheville	9	–	5	.643	10	–	10	.500
Longwood	10	–	10	.500	12	–	17	.414
Gardner–Webb	10	–	10	.500	11	–	15	.423
Hampton	9	–	9	.500	11	–	14	.440
High Point	6	–	11	.353	9	–	15	.375
USC Upstate	5	–	11	.313	5	–	18	.217
Presbyterian	5	–	12	.294	7	–	15	.318
Charleston Southern	2	–	15	.118	3	–	18	.143
† 2021 Big South tournament winner Charleston Southern suspended their season on February 23, 2021.

The 2020–21 Hampton Pirates men's basketball team represented Hampton University in the 2020–21 NCAA Division I men's basketball season. The Pirates, led by 12th-year head coach Edward Joyner Jr., played their home games at the Hampton Convocation Center in Hampton, Virginia as members of the Big South Conference.

In a season limited due to the ongoing COVID-19 pandemic, the Pirates finished the season 11–14, 9–9 in Big South play, to finish in seventh place. They lost to Radford in the quarterfinals of the Big South tournament.

== Previous season ==
The Pirates finished the 2019–20 season 15–19, 8–10 in Big South play, to finish in a tie for fifth place. In the first round of the Big South tournament, they defeated Longwood, advancing to the semifinals, where they upset the top-seeded Radford, to clinch their spot in the Big South tournament championship game. There, they squared up against Winthrop, dropping the game 68–76.

== Roster ==
2020–21 Hampton Pirates men's basketball team
Players
Coaches

Pos.	#	Name	Height	Weight	Year	Previous school	Hometown
G	0	Marquis Godwin	6 ft 5 in (1.96 m)	195 lb (88 kg)	Jr	Old Dominion	Hampton, VA
G	1	Russell (Deuce) Dean	6 ft 4 in (1.93 m)	200 lb (91 kg)	So	York Prep	Columbia, SC
G	3	Davion Warren	6 ft 6 in (1.98 m)	210 lb (95 kg)	Sr	Olney Central College	Buffalo, NY
G	4	Raymond Jr. Bethea	6 ft 5 in (1.96 m)	200 lb (91 kg)	Jr	Howard	Atlantic City, NJ
F	5	Dajour Dickens	7 ft 0 in (2.13 m)	215 lb (98 kg)	Jr	Old Dominion	Hampton, VA
G	11	Amir Nesbitt	6 ft 1 in (1.85 m)	180 lb (82 kg)	Fr	Miller School	Newport News, VA
G	12	Chris Shelton	6 ft 4 in (1.93 m)	190 lb (86 kg)	So	Louisa County HS	Louisa, VA
G/F	15	Saheem Anthony	6 ft 7 in (2.01 m)	200 lb (91 kg)	Sr	Northwest College	Brooklyn, NY
G	20	Tyler Chatman	6 ft 3 in (1.91 m)	180 lb (82 kg)	Fr	King's Fork HS	Suffolk, VA
G	22	Elijah Seward	6 ft 0 in (1.83 m)	190 lb (86 kg)	Fr	John Marshall HS	Richmond, VA
G/F	23	Dan Jr. Banister	6 ft 5 in (1.96 m)	190 lb (86 kg)	So	Cape Henry Collegiate	Chesapeake, VA
G	25	Bryce Earle	6 ft 0 in (1.83 m)	—	So	Cardinal Newman HS	Columbia, SC
F	32	Najee Thomas	6 ft 10 in (2.08 m)	210 lb (95 kg)	Jr	Brunswick CC	Fayetteville, NC
F	45	Edward Oliver-Hampton	6 ft 7 in (2.01 m)	190 lb (86 kg)	Sr	Colby CC	Prince George's County, MD

Head coach

- Edward Joyner Jr. (Hampton)

Assistant coach(es)

- Darryl Sharp (Bloomsburg)
- Matthew Hamilton (Appalachian State)
- Keith Coutreyer (Washington Adventist)

Legend

- (C) Team captain
- (S) Suspended
- (I) Ineligible
- (W) Walk-on
- Injured
- Current redshirt

Roster
Last update: December 15, 2020

== Schedule and results ==
Date time, TV	Rank^{#}	Opponent^{#}	Result	Record	Site (attendance) city, state
Non-conference regular season
December 1, 2020*; 8:00 p.m., ESPN+		at George Washington	W 82–78	1–0	Charles E. Smith Center; Washington, D.C.
December 3, 2020*; 7:00 p.m., FloHoops		at William & Mary	Postponed		Kaplan Arena; Williamsburg, VA
December 7, 2020*; 7:00 p.m.		at Norfolk State	L 64–76	1–1	Joseph G. Echols Memorial Hall (250); Norfolk, VA
December 10, 2020*; 6:00 p.m., ESPN+		Regent	Canceled		Hampton Convocation Center; Hampton, VA
December 13, 2020*; 1:00 p.m., ESPN+		at VMI; Keydet Classic	L 64–79	1–2	Cameron Hall (228); Lexington, VA
December 16, 2020*; 6:00 p.m., ESPN+/SKY4		William & Mary	L 58–75	1–3	Hampton Convocation Center; Hampton, VA
December 18, 2020*; 5:00 p.m., ESPN+		at Howard	L 76–81	1–4	Burr Gymnasium; Washington, D.C.
Big South Conference regular season
December 21, 2020; 7:00 p.m., ESPN+		at Charleston Southern	W 67–55	2–4 (1–0)	Buccaneer Field House (38); North Charleston, SC
December 22, 2020; 6:00 p.m., ESPN+		at Charleston Southern	W 70–68	3–4 (2–0)	Buccaneer Field House (38); North Charleston, SC
December 30, 2020; 2:00 p.m., ESPN+		Gardner–Webb	W 80–69	4–4 (3–0)	Hampton Convocation Center; Hampton, VA
December 31, 2020; 12:00 p.m., ESPN+/SKY4		Gardner–Webb	L 69–80	4–5 (3–1)	Hampton Convocation Center; Hampton, VA
January 4, 2021; 7:00 p.m., ESPNU		at Radford	L 66–79	4–6 (3–2)	Dedmon Center (250); Radford, VA
January 5, 2021; 6:00 p.m., ESPN+		at Radford	L 65–76	4–7 (3–3)	Dedmon Center; Radford, VA
January 9, 2021; 3:00 p.m., ESPN+		UNC Asheville	W 73–71	5–7 (4–3)	Hampton Convocation Center; Hampton, VA
January 10, 2021; 1:00 p.m., ESPN+		UNC Asheville	L 77–85	5–8 (4–4)	Hampton Convocation Center; Hampton, VA
January 14, 2021; 6:00 p.m., ESPN+		at USC Upstate	W 69–68	6–8 (5–4)	G. B. Hodge Center (140); Spartanburg, SC
January 15, 2021; 6:00 p.m., ESPN+		at USC Upstate	W 84–74	7–8 (6–4)	G. B. Hodge Center (140); Spartanburg, SC
January 24, 2021; 3:00 p.m., ESPN+		at Winthrop	Postponed		Winthrop Coliseum; Rock Hill, SC
January 25, 2021; 6:00 p.m., ESPN+		at Winthrop	Postponed		Winthrop Coliseum; Rock Hill, SC
January 29, 2021; 6:00 p.m., ESPN3		High Point	Postponed		Hampton Convocation Center; Hampton, VA
January 30, 2021; 4:00 p.m., ESPN+		High Point	Postponed		Hampton Convocation Center; Hampton, VA
February 7, 2021; 2:00 p.m., ESPN3		High Point	L 58–72	7–9 (6–5)	Hampton Convocation Center; Hampton, VA
February 8, 2021; 4:00 p.m., ESPN+		High Point	W 76–71	8–9 (7–5)	Hampton Convocation Center; Hampton, VA
February 11, 2021; 6:00 p.m., ESPN+		Presbyterian	L 70–85	8–10 (7–6)	Hampton Convocation Center; Hampton, VA
February 12, 2021; 4:00 p.m., ESPN+		Presbyterian	W 62–57	9–10 (8–6)	Hampton Convocation Center; Hampton, VA
February 15, 2021; 6:00 p.m., ESPN+		at Longwood	L 73–83	9–11 (8–7)	Willett Hall; Farmville, VA
February 18, 2021; 6:00 p.m., ESPN+		Campbell	L 57–76	9–12 (8–8)	Hampton Convocation Center; Hampton, VA
February 19, 2021; 6:00 p.m., ESPN+		Campbell	L 68–73	9–13 (8–9)	Hampton Convocation Center; Hampton, VA
February 24, 2021; 6:00 p.m., ESPN3		at Longwood	W 74–68	10–13 (9–9)	Willett Hall; Farmville, VA
Big South tournament
February 27, 2021; 2:00 p.m., ESPN3	(7)	(10) Presbyterian; First round	W 67–65	11–13	Hampton Convocation Center; Hampton, VA
March 1, 2021; 6:00 p.m., ESPN3	(7)	(2) Radford; Quarterfinals	L 52–67	11–14	Dedmon Center; Radford, VA
*Non-conference game. ^{#}Rankings from AP poll. (#) Tournament seedings in parentheses. All times are in Eastern.
