= 2020–21 Radford Highlanders men's basketball team =

American college basketball season

2020–21 Radford Highlanders men's basketball
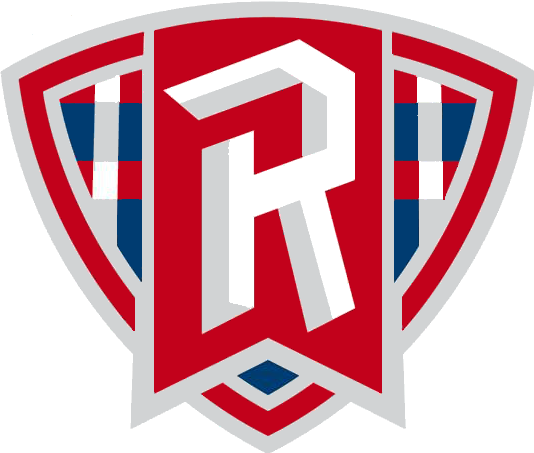
- Conference: Big South Conference
- Record: 15–12 (12–6 Big South)
- Head coach: Mike Jones (10th season)
- Assistant coaches: Ron Jirsa; David Boyden; Donny Lind
- Home arena: Dedmon Center

2020–21 Big South men's basketball standings
	Conf.				Overall
Team	W		L	PCT	W		L	PCT
Winthrop †	17	–	1	.944	23	–	2	.920
Radford	12	–	6	.667	15	–	12	.556
Campbell	11	–	6	.647	17	–	10	.630
UNC Asheville	9	–	5	.643	10	–	10	.500
Longwood	10	–	10	.500	12	–	17	.414
Gardner–Webb	10	–	10	.500	11	–	15	.423
Hampton	9	–	9	.500	11	–	14	.440
High Point	6	–	11	.353	9	–	15	.375
USC Upstate	5	–	11	.313	5	–	18	.217
Presbyterian	5	–	12	.294	7	–	15	.318
Charleston Southern	2	–	15	.118	3	–	18	.143
† 2021 Big South tournament winner Charleston Southern suspended their season on February 23, 2021.

The 2020–21 Radford Highlanders men's basketball team represented Radford University in the 2020–21 NCAA Division I men's basketball season. The Highlanders, led by tenth-year head coach Mike Jones, played their home games at the Dedmon Center in Radford, Virginia, as members of the Big South Conference.

== Previous season ==
The Highlanders finished the 2019–20 season 21–11, 15–3 in Big South play, to win a share of the regular-season championship. They defeated Charleston Southern in quarterfinals of the Big South tournament before losing in the semifinals to Hampton. As a regular-season conference champion, and No. 1 seed in their conference tournament, who failed to win their conference tournament, they received and automatic bid to the NIT. However, the NIT, and all other postseason tournaments, were cancelled amid the COVID-19 pandemic.

== Roster ==
2020–21 Radford Highlanders men's basketball team
Players
Coaches

Pos.	#	Name	Height	Weight	Year	Hometown
G	0	Fah'Mir Ali	5 ft 10 in (1.78 m)	180 lb (82 kg)	Fr	Wilmington, DE
G	1	Keishon Porter	6 ft 4 in (1.93 m)	190 lb (86 kg)	Fr	Macclesfield, NC
G	2	Quinton Morton-Robertson	5 ft 8 in (1.73 m)	165 lb (75 kg)	So	Radford, VA
G	3	Jordan Hamphill	6 ft 5 in (1.96 m)	190 lb (86 kg)	RS Jr	Bentonville, AR
G	4	Josiah Jeffers	6 ft 1 in (1.85 m)	170 lb (77 kg)	Jr	Burlington, NC
G	5	Dante Moses	6 ft 4 in (1.93 m)	190 lb (86 kg)	Jr	Riviera Beach, FL
F	10	Joshua Walker	6 ft 7 in (2.01 m)	200 lb (91 kg)	Fr	Upper Marlboro, MD
G/F	11	Miles Jones	6 ft 6 in (1.98 m)	210 lb (95 kg)	So	Radford, VA
F	13	Shaquan Jules	6 ft 7 in (2.01 m)	235 lb (107 kg)	Jr	Orlando, FL
F	14	Chyree Walker	6 ft 5 in (1.96 m)	200 lb (91 kg)	RS Jr	Upper Marlboro, MD
G	15	Bryan Hart	6 ft 1 in (1.85 m)	180 lb (82 kg)	Sr	Hampton, VA
F	20	Dravon Mangum	6 ft 8 in (2.03 m)	200 lb (91 kg)	RS So	Roxboro, NC
G	21	Kobe Tigney	6 ft 3 in (1.91 m)	195 lb (88 kg)	RS Fr	Winchester, VA
C	22	Lewis Djonkam	6 ft 9 in (2.06 m)	245 lb (111 kg)	RS Jr	Springfield, VA
F	30	Jamal Burke	6 ft 10 in (2.08 m)	240 lb (109 kg)	Jr	Greenville, SC
G	45	Xavier Lipscomb	6 ft 2 in (1.88 m)	195 lb (88 kg)	Fr	Washington, D.C.

Head coach

- Mike Jones (Howard)

Assistant coach(es)

- Ron Jirsa (Gettysburg)
- David Boyden (Western Kentucky)
- Donny Lind (Loyola (MD))

Legend

- (C) Team captain
- (S) Suspended
- (I) Ineligible
- (W) Walk-on
- Injured
- Current redshirt

Roster
Last update: December 17, 2020

== Schedule and results ==
Date time, TV	Rank^{#}	Opponent^{#}	Result	Record	Site (attendance) city, state
Regular season
November 25, 2020*; 12:00 p.m., ACCNX		at Virginia Tech	L 62–77	0–1	Cassell Coliseum (250); Blacksburg, VA
November 28, 2020*; 7:00 p.m.		vs. Norfolk State	L 54–57	0–2	Atlantic Union Bank Center (150); Harrisonburg, VA
November 29, 2020*; 8:30 p.m., FloSports		at James Madison	L 59–67	0–3	Atlantic Union Bank Center (250); Harrisonburg, VA
December 5, 2020*; 2:00 p.m., ESPN+		at East Carolina	L 50–63	0–4	Williams Arena at Minges Coliseum (78); Greenville, NC
December 9, 2020*; 2:00 p.m., ESPN+		Mars Hill	W 98–50	1–4	Dedmon Center (250); Radford, VA
December 14, 2020; 6:00 p.m., ESPN+		Longwood	W 67–66	2–4 (1–0)	Dedmon Center (250); Radford, VA
December 15, 2020; 6:00 p.m., ESPN+		Longwood	W 62–53	3–4 (2–0)	Dedmon Center (250); Radford, VA
December 19, 2020*; 8:00 p.m., SECN+		at Vanderbilt	L 50–59	3–5	Memorial Gymnasium (61); Nashville, TN
December 30, 2020; 5:00 p.m., ESPN+		at Presbyterian	W 71–65	4–5 (3–0)	Templeton Physical Education Center (5); Clinton, SC
December 31, 2020; 3:00 p.m., ESPN+		at Presbyterian	L 63–65	4–6 (3–1)	Templeton Physical Education Center (7); Clinton, SC
January 4, 2021; 7:00 p.m., ESPNU		Hampton	W 79–66	5–6 (4–1)	Dedmon Center (250); Radford, VA
January 5, 2021; 6:00 p.m., ESPN+		Hampton	W 76–65	6–6 (5–1)	Dedmon Center (250); Radford, VA
January 9, 2021; 5:00 p.m., ESPN+		at Charleston Southern	W 79–64	7–6 (6–1)	Buccaneer Field House (52); North Charleston, SC
January 10, 2021; 3:00 p.m., ESPN+		at Charleston Southern	W 68–48	8–6 (7–1)	Buccaneer Field House (7); North Charleston, SC
January 19, 2021; 7:00 p.m., ESPN+		at Campbell	W 97–91 ^{3OT}	9–6 (8–1)	Gore Arena; Buies Creek, NC
January 20, 2021; 7:00 p.m., ESPN+		at Campbell	W 67–61	10–6 (9–1)	Gore Arena; Buies Creek, NC
January 24, 2021; 2:00 p.m., ESPN+		at UNC Asheville	L 68–76	10–7 (9–2)	Kimmel Arena; Asheville, NC
January 25, 2021; 3:00 p.m., ESPN+		at UNC Asheville	W 73–63	11–7 (10–2)	Kimmel Arena; Asheville, NC
January 29, 2021; 6:00 p.m., ESPN+		Gardner–Webb	Postponed due to COVID-19		Dedmon Center; Radford, VA
January 30, 2021; 4:00 p.m., ESPN+		Gardner–Webb	Postponed due to COVID-19		Dedmon Center; Radford, VA
February 4, 2021; 6:00 p.m.		USC Upstate	W 63–61	12–7 (11–2)	Dedmon Center; Radford, VA
February 5, 2021; 6:00 p.m.		USC Upstate	W 102–66	13–7 (12–2)	Dedmon Center; Radford, VA
February 11, 2021; 6:00 p.m., ESPN+		Winthrop	L 64–80	13–8 (12–3)	Dedmon Center; Radford, VA
February 12, 2021; 6:00 p.m., ESPN3		Winthrop	L 47–55	13–9 (12–4)	Dedmon Center; Radford, VA
February 18, 2021; 6:00 p.m., ESPN+		Gardner–Webb	L 57–69	13–10 (12–5)	Dedmon Center; Radford, VA
February 19, 2021; 6:00 p.m., ESPN+		Gardner–Webb	L 49–77	13–11 (12–6)	Dedmon Center; Radford, VA
February 24, 2021*; 6:00 p.m., ESPN+		Mount Aloysius	W 74–51	14–11	Dedmon Center; Radford, VA
Big South tournament
March 1, 2021; 6:00 p.m., ESPN3	(2)	(7) Hampton; Quarterfinals	W 67–52	15–11	Dedmon Center; Radford, VA
March 4, 2021; 8:00 p.m., ESPN+	(2)	(3) Campbell; Semifinals	L 60–78	15–12	Dedmon Center; Radford, VA
*Non-conference game. ^{#}Rankings from AP poll. (#) Tournament seedings in parentheses. All times are in Eastern.
