= 2020–21 UNC Asheville Bulldogs men's basketball team =

American college basketball season

2020–21 UNC Asheville Bulldogs men's basketball
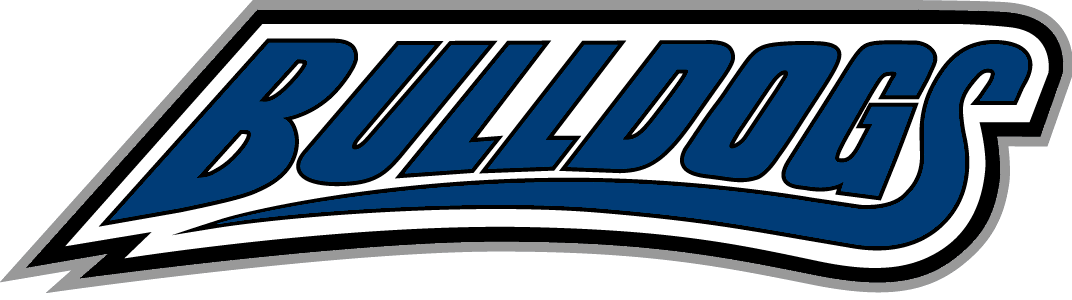
- Conference: Big South Conference
- Record: 10–10 (9–5 Big South)
- Head coach: Mike Morrell (3rd season)
- Assistant coaches: Mike Venezia; Neil Dixon; Woody Taylor
- Home arena: Kimmel Arena

2020–21 Big South men's basketball standings
	Conf.				Overall
Team	W		L	PCT	W		L	PCT
Winthrop †	17	–	1	.944	23	–	2	.920
Radford	12	–	6	.667	15	–	12	.556
Campbell	11	–	6	.647	17	–	10	.630
UNC Asheville	9	–	5	.643	10	–	10	.500
Longwood	10	–	10	.500	12	–	17	.414
Gardner–Webb	10	–	10	.500	11	–	15	.423
Hampton	9	–	9	.500	11	–	14	.440
High Point	6	–	11	.353	9	–	15	.375
USC Upstate	5	–	11	.313	5	–	18	.217
Presbyterian	5	–	12	.294	7	–	15	.318
Charleston Southern	2	–	15	.118	3	–	18	.143
† 2021 Big South tournament winner Charleston Southern suspended their season on February 23, 2021.

The 2020–21 UNC Asheville Bulldogs men's basketball team represented the University of North Carolina at Asheville in the 2020–21 NCAA Division I men's basketball season. The Bulldogs, led by third-year head coach Mike Morrell, played their home games at Kimmel Arena in Asheville, North Carolina, as members of the Big South Conference.

== Previous season ==
The Bulldogs finished the 2019–20 season 15–16, 8–10 in Big South play, to finish in a tie for fifth place. They defeated Campbell in the first round of the Big South tournament before losing in the quarterfinals to Gardner–Webb.

== Roster ==
2020–21 UNC Asheville Bulldogs men's basketball team
Players
Coaches

Pos.	#	Name	Height	Weight	Year	Hometown
G	0	Lavar Batts Jr.	6 ft 3 in (1.91 m)	185 lb (84 kg)	RS Jr	Concord, NC
G	1	Jamon Battle	6 ft 5 in (1.96 m)	210 lb (95 kg)	So	Richmond, VA
G	2	LJ Thorpe	6 ft 5 in (1.96 m)	215 lb (98 kg)	RS Jr	West Palm Beach, FL
G	3	Tajion Jones	6 ft 5 in (1.96 m)	190 lb (86 kg)	RS Jr	Oak Ridge, TN
G	4	Raquan Brown	6 ft 3 in (1.91 m)	205 lb (93 kg)	So	Charlotte, NC
G	5	Trent Stephney	6 ft 2 in (1.88 m)	170 lb (77 kg)	So	Knoxville, TN
F	10	Evan Clayborne	6 ft 6 in (1.98 m)	228 lb (103 kg)	GS	Dayton, OH
F	11	BJ Marable	6 ft 9 in (2.06 m)	230 lb (104 kg)	Fr	Knoxville, TN
G	13	Chase Forte	6 ft 3 in (1.91 m)	185 lb (84 kg)	Fr	Raleigh, NC
F	14	Luke Lawson	6 ft 7 in (2.01 m)	180 lb (82 kg)	Jr	Coeburn, VA
G	20	DeVon Baker	6 ft 2 in (1.88 m)	190 lb (86 kg)	Jr	Dayton, OH
F	22	Coty Jude	6 ft 9 in (2.06 m)	190 lb (86 kg)	Jr	Fort Gay, WV
F	23	BJ McLaurin	6 ft 7 in (2.01 m)	225 lb (102 kg)	So	Fayetteville, NC
G	24	AJ McBride	6 ft 1 in (1.85 m)	190 lb (86 kg)	So	Houston, TX
G	30	Deacon Heath	6 ft 0 in (1.83 m)	170 lb (77 kg)	Jr	Banner Elk, NC
F	55	Silas Mason	6 ft 7 in (2.01 m)	185 lb (84 kg)	Fr	Greensboro, NC

Head coach

- Mike Morrell (Milligan)

Assistant coach(es)

- Mike Venezia (Colgate)
- Neil Dixon (West Virginia)
- Woody Taylor (Eckerd)

Legend

- (C) Team captain
- (S) Suspended
- (I) Ineligible
- (W) Walk-on
- Injured
- Current redshirt

Roster
Last update: December 16, 2020

== Schedule and results ==
Date time, TV	Rank^{#}	Opponent^{#}	Result	Record	Site (attendance) city, state
Regular season
November 27, 2020*; 3:30 p.m., ESPN+		UNC Wilmington; Mako Medical Asheville Classic	L 68–76	0–1	Kimmel Arena; Asheville, NC
November 28, 2020*; 4:00 p.m., WYCW		Western Carolina; Mako Medical Asheville Classic	L 81–83 ^{OT}	0–2	Kimmel Arena; Asheville, NC
December 5, 2020*; 2:00 p.m., WYCW		South Carolina State	W 77–56	1–2	Kimmel Arena; Asheville, NC
December 12, 2020; 2:00 p.m., ESPN+		High Point	W 80–67	2–2 (1–0)	Kimmel Arena; Asheville, NC
December 13, 2020; 1:00 p.m., ESPN+		High Point	W 90–84 ^{OT}	3–2 (2–0)	Kimmel Arena; Asheville, NC
December 16, 2020*; 7:00 p.m., ESPN+		at Chattanooga	L 66–69	3–3	McKenzie Arena; Chattanooga, TN
December 22, 2020*; 6:00 p.m.		at Marshall	L 67–88	3–4	Cam Henderson Center (1,244); Huntington, WV
December 30, 2020; 3:00 p.m., ESPN+		at Longwood	W 80–73	4–4 (3–0)	Willett Hall; Farmville, VA
December 31, 2020; 3:00 p.m., ESPN+		at Longwood	L 55–65	4–5 (3–1)	Willett Hall; Farmville, VA
January 9, 2021; 3:00 p.m., ESPN+		at Hampton	L 71–73	4–6 (3–2)	Hampton Convocation Center; Hampton, VA
January 10, 2021; 1:00 p.m., ESPN+		at Hampton	W 85–77	5–6 (4–2)	Hampton Convocation Center; Hampton, VA
January 14, 2021; 4:00 p.m., ESPN+		Charleston Southern	W 92–54	6–6 (5–2)	Kimmel Arena; Asheville, NC
January 15, 2021; 2:00 p.m., ESPN3		Charleston Southern	W 83–75	7–6 (6–2)	Kimmel Arena; Asheville, NC
January 19, 2021; 7:00 p.m., ESPN+		at Gardner–Webb	W 79–75	8–6 (7–2)	Paul Porter Arena; Boiling Springs, NC
January 20, 2021; 7:00 p.m., ESPN+		at Gardner–Webb	L 57–84	8–7 (7–3)	Paul Porter Arena; Boiling Springs, NC
January 24, 2021; 2:00 p.m., WYCW		Radford	W 76–68	9–7 (8–3)	Kimmel Arena; Asheville, NC
January 25, 2021; 3:00 p.m., ESPN+		Radford	L 63–73	9–8 (8–4)	Kimmel Arena; Asheville, NC
January 28, 2021; 7:00 p.m., ESPNU		at Winthrop	L 80–84	9–9 (8–5)	Winthrop Coliseum (41); Rock Hill, SC
January 29, 2021; 6:00 p.m., ESPN3		at Winthrop	W 57–55	10–9 (9–5)	Winthrop Coliseum (43); Rock Hill, SC
February 4, 2021; 7:00 p.m., ESPNU		Campbell	Postponed due to COVID-19 issues		Kimmel Arena; Asheville, NC
February 5, 2021; 5:00 p.m., ESPN+		Campbell	Postponed due to COVID-19 issues		Kimmel Arena; Asheville, NC
February 11, 2021; 5:30 p.m., ESPN+		at USC Upstate	Postponed due to COVID-19 issues		G. B. Hodge Center; Spartanburg, SC
February 12, 2021; 5:30 p.m., ESPN+		at USC Upstate	Postponed due to COVID-19 issues		G. B. Hodge Center; Spartanburg, SC
Big South tournament
March 1, 2021; 7:00 p.m., ESPN3	(4)	(5) Longwood; Quarterfinals	L 61–77	10–10	Kimmel Arena; Asheville, NC
*Non-conference game. ^{#}Rankings from AP poll. (#) Tournament seedings in parentheses. All times are in Eastern.
