= 2020–21 Longwood Lancers men's basketball team =

American college basketball season

2020–21 Longwood Lancers men's basketball

CBI, Quarterfinals
- Conference: Big South Conference
- Record: 12–17 (10–10 Big South)
- Head coach: Griff Aldrich (3rd season)
- Assistant coaches: Marty McGillan; Austin Shaver; Donovan Williams
- Home arena: Willett Hall

2020–21 Big South men's basketball standings
	Conf.				Overall
Team	W		L	PCT	W		L	PCT
Winthrop †	17	–	1	.944	23	–	2	.920
Radford	12	–	6	.667	15	–	12	.556
Campbell	11	–	6	.647	17	–	10	.630
UNC Asheville	9	–	5	.643	10	–	10	.500
Longwood	10	–	10	.500	12	–	17	.414
Gardner–Webb	10	–	10	.500	11	–	15	.423
Hampton	9	–	9	.500	11	–	14	.440
High Point	6	–	11	.353	9	–	15	.375
USC Upstate	5	–	11	.313	5	–	18	.217
Presbyterian	5	–	12	.294	7	–	15	.318
Charleston Southern	2	–	15	.118	3	–	18	.143
† 2021 Big South tournament winner Charleston Southern suspended their season on February 23, 2021.

The 2020–21 Longwood Lancers men's basketball team represented Longwood University in the 2020–21 NCAA Division I men's basketball season. The Lancers, led by third-year head coach Griff Aldrich, played their home games at Willett Hall in Farmville, Virginia as members of the Big South Conference. They finished the season 12-17, 10-10 to finish in 5th place. They defeated UNC Asheville in the quarterfinals of the Big South tournament before losing in the semifinals to Winthrop. They received an invitation to the CBI where they lost in the quarterfinals to Pepperdine.

== Previous season ==
The Lancers finished the 2019–20 season 14–18, 9–9 in Big South play to finish in fourth place. They lost in the quarterfinals of the Big South tournament to Hampton.

== Roster ==
2020–21 Longwood Lancers men's basketball team
Players
Coaches

Pos.	#	Name	Height	Weight	Year	Hometown
F	0	Leslie Nkereuwem	6 ft 7 in (2.01 m)	225 lb (102 kg)	So	Lawrenceville, Georgia
F	1	Christian Wilson	6 ft 6 in (1.98 m)	195 lb (88 kg)	Jr	Queens, New York
G	2	Nate Lliteras	6 ft 7 in (2.01 m)	210 lb (95 kg)	RS Fr	Seward, Nebraska
G	3	DeShaun Wade	6 ft 2 in (1.88 m)	200 lb (91 kg)	Jr	Virginia Beach, Virginia
F	4	Zac Watson	6 ft 7 in (2.01 m)	215 lb (98 kg)	Jr	Plano, Texas
F	5	Bennett Mohn	6 ft 6 in (1.98 m)	185 lb (84 kg)	RS Fr	Austin, Texas
F	10	Ilija Stefanovic	6 ft 10 in (2.08 m)	215 lb (98 kg)	Sr	Novi Sad, Serbia
G	11	Justin Hill	6 ft 0 in (1.83 m)	185 lb (84 kg)	Fr	Houston, Texas
G	13	Heru Bligen	6 ft 3 in (1.91 m)	180 lb (82 kg)	So	Prince George's County, Maryland
F	14	Abraham Deng	6 ft 11 in (2.11 m)	230 lb (104 kg)	So	Juba, South Sudan
G	23	Jermaine Drewey	6 ft 2 in (1.88 m)	190 lb (86 kg)	Jr	Houston, Texas
G	24	Cameron O'Conner	6 ft 5 in (1.96 m)	185 lb (84 kg)	Fr	Roanoke, Virginia
G	30	C.J. Williams	6 ft 0 in (1.83 m)	180 lb (82 kg)	RS Jr	Chester, Virginia
G	31	Dean Lockley	6 ft 2 in (1.88 m)	185 lb (84 kg)	Fr	Charlottesville, Virginia
G	34	Lorenz Boykin	6 ft 0 in (1.83 m)	185 lb (84 kg)	Fr	Richmond, Virginia
F	35	Jesper Granlund	6 ft 6 in (1.98 m)	210 lb (95 kg)	Fr	Helsinki, Finland
G	55	Juan Munoz	6 ft 0 in (1.83 m)	170 lb (77 kg)	RS Jr	Morrisville, North Carolina

Head coach

- Griff Aldrich (Hampden–Sydney)

Assistant coach(es)

- Marty McGillan (UNC Wilmington)
- Austin Shaver (Virginia)
- Donovan Williams (Park)

Legend

- (C) Team captain
- (S) Suspended
- (I) Ineligible
- (W) Walk-on
- Injured
- Current redshirt

Roster
Last update: December 16, 2020

== Schedule and results ==
Date time, TV	Rank^{#}	Opponent^{#}	Result	Record	Site (attendance) city, state
Non-conference regular season
November 27, 2020*; 7:00 pm, ACCN		at Wake Forest	L 60–71	0–1	LJVM Coliseeum; Winston-Salem, NC
December 1, 2020*; 5:00 pm, ESPN+		at VMI	L 71–84	0–2	Cameron Hall (200); Lexington, VA
December 6, 2020*; 4:00 pm, ESPN+		Greensboro College	L 64–67	0–3	Willett Hall; Farmville, VA
December 8, 2020*; 6:00 pm, ESPN+		North Carolina A&T	W 77–60	1–3	Willett Hall; Farmville, VA
December 14, 2020; 6:00 pm, ESPN+		at Radford	L 66–67	1–4 (0–1)	Dedmon Center (250); Radford, VA
December 15, 2020; 6:00 pm, ESPN+		at Radford	L 53–62	1–5 (0–2)	Dedmon Center (250); Radford, VA
December 19, 2020*; 12:30 pm, ESPN+		The Citadel	L 89–91	1–6	Willett Hall; Farmville, VA
December 21, 2020*; 8:30 pm, ACCN		at No. 24 Virginia Tech	L 58–84	1–7	Cassell Coliseum (250); Blacksburg, VA
December 30, 2020; 3:00 pm, ESPN+		UNC Asheville	L 73–80	1–8 (0–3)	Willett Hall; Farmville, VA
December 31, 2020; 3:00 pm, ESPN+		UNC Asheville	W 65–55	2–8 (1–3)	Willett Hall; Farmville, VA
January 4, 2021; 6:00 pm, ESPN+		at USC Upstate	L 69–71	2–9 (1–4)	G. B. Hodge Center (140); Spartanburg, SC
January 5, 2021; 6:00 pm, ESPN+		at USC Upstate	L 59–65	2–10 (1–5)	G. B. Hodge Center (140); Spartanburg, SC
January 9, 2021; 6:00 pm, ESPN3		Campbell	L 58–64	2–11 (1–6)	Willett Hall; Farmville, VA
January 10, 2021; 6:00 pm, ESPN+		Campbell	W 78–69	3–11 (2–6)	Willett Hall; Farmville, VA
January 14, 2021; 6:00 pm, ESPN+		at Winthrop	L 61–72	3–12 (2–7)	Winthrop Coliseum; Rock Hill, SC
January 15, 2021; 6:00 pm, ESPN+		at Winthrop	L 50–70	3–13 (2–8)	Winthrop Coliseum (36); Rock Hill, SC
January 19, 2021; 6:00 pm, ESPN+		High Point	W 75–54	4–13 (3–8)	Willett Hall; Farmville, VA
January 20, 2021; 6:00 pm, ESPN+		High Point	W 67–54	5–13 (4–8)	Willett Hall; Farmville, VA
January 29, 2021; 6:00 pm, ESPN+		at Presbyterian	W 49–45	6–13 (5–8)	Templeton Physical Education Center (6); Clinton, SC
January 30, 2021; 4:00 pm, ESPN+		at Presbyterian	L 54–66	6–14 (5–9)	Templeton Physical Education Center (4); Clinton, SC
February 11, 2021; 6:00 pm, ESPN+		Gardner–Webb	W 57–54	7–14 (6–9)	Willett Hall; Farmville, VA
February 12, 2021; 6:00 pm, ESPN+		Gardner–Webb	W 78–71	8–14 (7–9)	Willett Hall; Farmville, VA
February 15, 2021; ESPN+		Hampton	W 83–73	9–14 (8–9)	Willett Hall; Farmville, VA
February 18, 2021; 6:00 pm, ESPN+		at Charleston Southern	W 70–62	10–14 (9–9)	Buccaneer Field House (30); North Charleston, SC
February 19, 2021; 6:00 pm, ESPN+		at Charleston Southern	W 64–58	11–14 (10–9)	Buccaneer Field House (34); North Charleston, SC
February 24, 2021; 6:00 pm, ESPN+		Hampton	L 68–74	11–15 (10–10)	Willett Hall; Farmville, VA
Big South tournament
March 1, 2021; 7:00 pm, ESPN3	(5)	at (4) UNC Asheville; Quarterfinals	W 77–61	12–15	Kimmel Arena; Asheville, NC
March 4, 2021; 7:00 pm, ESPN+	(5)	at (1) Winthrop; Semifinals	L 62–81	12–16	Winthrop Coliseum; Rock Hill, SC
CBI
March 22, 2021; 5:30 pm, FloSports		vs. Pepperdine; Quarterfinals	L 66–80	12–17	Ocean Center; Daytona Beach, FL
*Non-conference game. ^{#}Rankings from AP Poll. (#) Tournament seedings in parentheses. All times are in Eastern.
