= 2020–21 High Point Panthers men's basketball team =

American college basketball season

2020–21 High Point Panthers men's basketball
- Conference: Big South Conference
- Record: 9–15 (6–11 Big South)
- Head coach: Tubby Smith (3rd season)
- Assistant coaches: G. G. Smith; Eric Grabriel; Keith Gatlin
- Home arena: Millis Athletic Convocation Center

2020–21 Big South men's basketball standings
	Conf.				Overall
Team	W		L	PCT	W		L	PCT
Winthrop †	17	–	1	.944	23	–	2	.920
Radford	12	–	6	.667	15	–	12	.556
Campbell	11	–	6	.647	17	–	10	.630
UNC Asheville	9	–	5	.643	10	–	10	.500
Longwood	10	–	10	.500	12	–	17	.414
Gardner–Webb	10	–	10	.500	11	–	15	.423
Hampton	9	–	9	.500	11	–	14	.440
High Point	6	–	11	.353	9	–	15	.375
USC Upstate	5	–	11	.313	5	–	18	.217
Presbyterian	5	–	12	.294	7	–	15	.318
Charleston Southern	2	–	15	.118	3	–	18	.143
† 2021 Big South tournament winner Charleston Southern suspended their season on February 23, 2021.

The 2020–21 High Point Panthers men's basketball team represented High Point University in the 2020–21 NCAA Division I men's basketball season. The Panthers, led by third-year head coach Tubby Smith, played their home games at the Millis Athletic Convocation Center in High Point, North Carolina as members of the Big South Conference. This was the Panthers' final season at the Millis Center, with the new Qubein Center opening for 2021–22.

In a season limited due to the ongoing COVID-19 pandemic, the Panthers recorded 9–15 record, 6–11 in Big South play, to finish in eighth place. They defeated USC Upstate in the first round of the Big South tournament before losing to Winthrop in the quarterfinals.

== Previous season ==
The Panthers finished the 2019–20 season 9–23, 6–12 in Big South play, to finish in a tie for tenth place. They lost in the first round of the Big South tournament to USC Upstate.

== Roster ==
2020–21 High Point Panthers men's basketball team
Players
Coaches

Pos.	#	Name	Height	Weight	Year	Hometown
G	1	John-Michael Wright	6 ft 1 in (1.85 m)	185 lb (84 kg)	So	Fayetteville, NC
G	2	Denny II Slay	5 ft 11 in (1.8 m)	193 lb (88 kg)	Sr	Woodbridge, VA
G	3	Ahmil Flowers	6 ft 3 in (1.91 m)	180 lb (82 kg)	Fr	Greensboro, NC
G	5	Alex Holt	6 ft 8 in (2.03 m)	250 lb (113 kg)	Fr	Lexington, NC
F/C	10	Emmanuel Izunabor	6 ft 8 in (2.03 m)	210 lb (95 kg)	So	Fayetteville, NC
G	11	Bryant Randleman	6 ft 4 in (1.93 m)	190 lb (86 kg)	So	Durham, NC
G	12	Bryson Childress	5 ft 8 in (1.73 m)	139 lb (63 kg)	Fr	Albemarle, NC
F	13	Cameron Billups	6 ft 3 in (1.91 m)	180 lb (82 kg)	So	Fayetteville, NC
G	14	Jaden Houst	6 ft 4 in (1.93 m)	201 lb (91 kg)	Fr	Richmond, VA
G	15	Nathaniel Ledford	6 ft 0 in (1.83 m)	175 lb (79 kg)	Fr	Burnsville, NC
F	20	Eric Jr. Coleman	6 ft 8 in (2.03 m)	215 lb (98 kg)	So	Buford, GA
F	21	Ryan Ayers	6 ft 6 in (1.98 m)	210 lb (95 kg)	So	Clemmons, NC
F	22	Rob III Peterson	6 ft 6 in (1.98 m)	190 lb (86 kg)	Jr	Charlotte, NC
F	24	Caleb Wright	6 ft 6 in (1.98 m)	206 lb (93 kg)	Fr	Phoenix, AZ
F	25	Lydell Elmore	6 ft 9 in (2.06 m)	189 lb (86 kg)	GS	Branchville, SC
G	31	AJ Hoynack	6 ft 4 in (1.93 m)	180 lb (82 kg)	Fr	Miami, FL
G	32	John-Michael Hughes	6 ft 1 in (1.85 m)	165 lb (75 kg)	RS Fr	Ligonier, PA
F	35	Caden Sanchez	6 ft 8 in (2.03 m)	236 lb (107 kg)	RS Jr	Columbus, OH
G	55	Zach Austin	6 ft 4 in (1.93 m)	—	Fr	Winston-Salem, NC

Head coach

- Tubby Smith (High Point)

Assistant coach(es)

- G. G. Smith (Georgia)
- Eric Gabriel (West Liberty)
- Keith Gatlin (Maryland)

Legend

- (C) Team captain
- (S) Suspended
- (I) Ineligible
- (W) Walk-on
- Injured
- Current redshirt

Roster
Last update: December 16, 2020

== Schedule and results ==
Date time, TV	Rank^{#}	Opponent^{#}	Result	Record	Site (attendance) city, state
Non-conference regular season
November 25, 2020*; 7:00 p.m., ESPN+		at Davidson	L 73–82	0–1	John M. Belk Arena (25); Davidson, NC
November 28, 2020*; 4:00 p.m.		at Elon	L 75–76	0–2	Schar Center; Elon, SC
December 5, 2020*; 6:00 p.m., ESPN+		North Florida	W 85–74	1–2	Millis Center (10); High Point, NC
December 12, 2020; 2:00 p.m., ESPN+		at UNC Asheville	L 67–80	1–3 (0–1)	Kimmel Arena; Asheville, NC
December 13, 2020; 1:00 p.m., ESPN+		at UNC Asheville	L 84–90 ^{OT}	1–4 (0–2)	Kimmel Arena; Asheville, NC
December 19, 2020*; 2:00 p.m., FloSports		at William & Mary	W 71–49	2–4	Kaplan Arena (0); Williamsburg, VA
December 22, 2020*; 7:00 p.m., ESPN+		at Eastern Kentucky	L 67–86	2–5	McBrayer Arena (723); Richmond, VA
December 30, 2020; 6:00 p.m., ESPN+		USC Upstate	W 63–52	3–5 (1–2)	Millis Center; High Point, NC
December 31, 2020; 6:00 p.m., ESPN+		USC Upstate	L 51–60	3–6 (1–3)	Millis Center; High Point, NC
January 19, 2021; 6:00 p.m., ESPN+		at Longwood	L 54–75	3–7 (1–4)	Willett Hall; Farmville, VA
January 20, 2021; 6:00 p.m., ESPN+		at Longwood	L 54–67	3–8 (1–5)	Willett Hall; Farmville, VA
January 24, 2021; 2:00 p.m., ESPN+		Presbyterian	W 81–57	4–8 (2–5)	Millis Center; High Point, NC
January 25, 2021; 6:00 p.m., ESPN+		Presbyterian	L 56–71	4–9 (2–6)	Millis Center; High Point, NC
January 29, 2021; 7:00 p.m., ESPN+		at Gardner–Webb	W 59–55	5–9 (3–6)	Paul Porter Arena; Boiling Springs, NC
January 30, 2021; 5:00 p.m., ESPN+		at Gardner–Webb	W 72–69	6–9 (4–6)	Paul Porter Arena; Boiling Springs, NC
February 7, 2021; 6:00 p.m., ESPN+		at Hampton	W 72–58	7–9 (5–6)	Hampton Convocation Center; Hampton, VA
February 8, 2021; 4:00 p.m., ESPN+		at Hampton	L 71–76	7–10 (5–7)	Hampton Convocation Center; Hampton, VA
February 11, 2021; 6:00 p.m., ESPN+		Charleston Southern	W 77–73	8–10 (6–7)	Millis Center; High Point, NC
February 12, 2021; 4:00 p.m., ESPN+		Charleston Southern	L 68–69	8–11 (6–8)	Millis Center; High Point, NC
February 18, 2021; 6:00 p.m., ESPN+		Winthrop	L 70–76	8–12 (6–9)	Millis Center; High Point, NC
February 19, 2021; 6:00 p.m., ESPN+		Winthrop	L 63–71	8–13 (6–10)	Millis Center; High Point, NC
February 24, 2021; 6:00 p.m., ESPN+		at Campbell	L 48–68	8–14 (6–11)	John W. Pope Jr. Convocation Center; Buies Creek, NC
Big South tournament
February 27, 2021; 4:00 p.m., ESPN3	(8)	(9) USC Upstate; First round	W 65–60	9–14	Millis Center; High Point, NC
March 1, 2021; 6:00 p.m., ESPN3	(8)	at (1) Winthrop; Quarterfinals	L 54–83	9–15	Winthrop Coliseum; Rock Hill, SC
*Non-conference game. ^{#}Rankings from AP poll. (#) Tournament seedings in parentheses. All times are in Eastern.
