= Barclay Radebaugh =

American college basketball coach (born 1965)

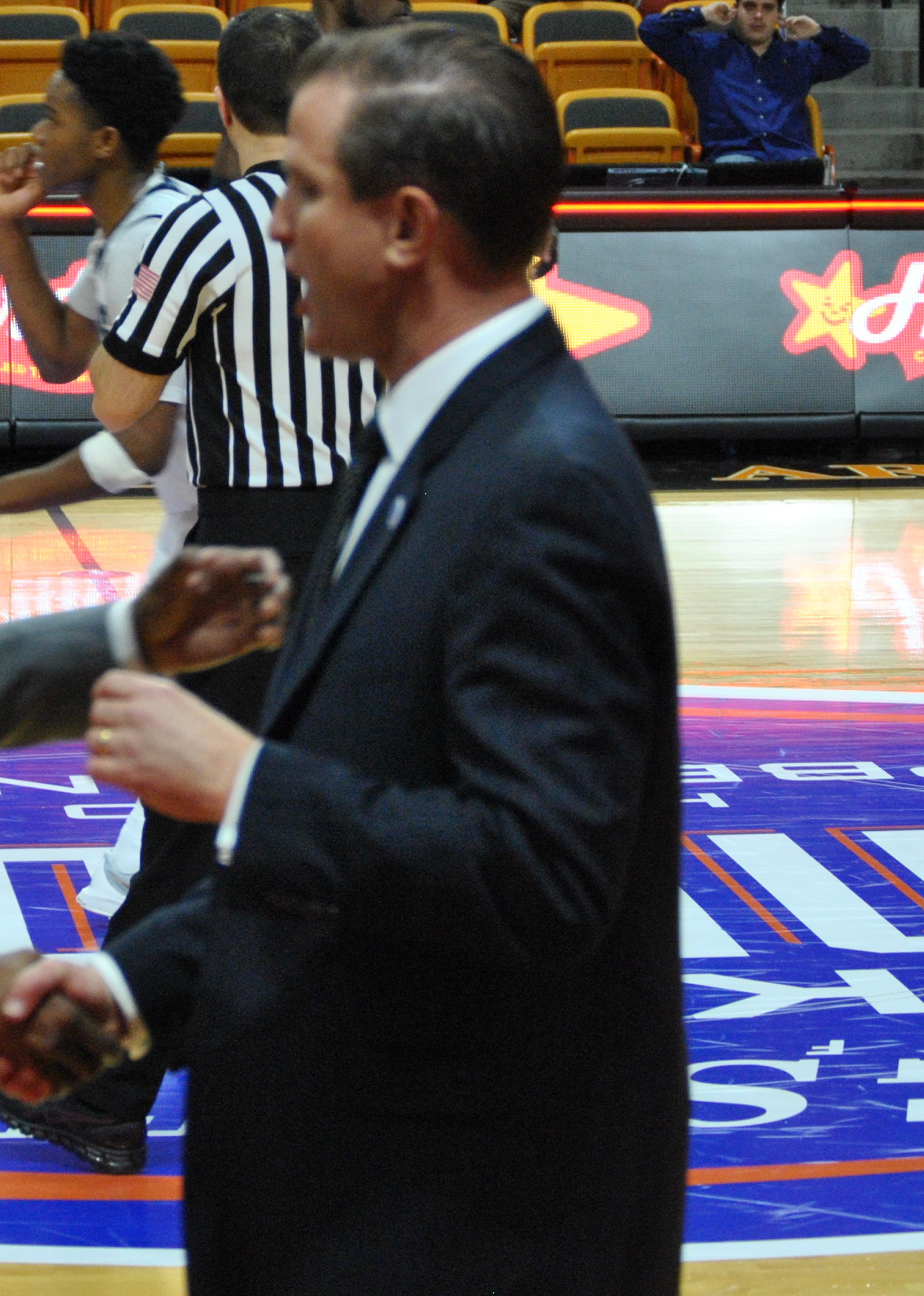

Biographical details
- Born: September 14, 1965 (age 61); Lincolnton, North Carolina, U.S.
- Education: East Tennessee State

Coaching career (HC unless noted)
- 1986–1988: East Tennessee State (assistant)
- 1989–1990: Wofford (assistant)
- 1990–1994: Furman (assistant)
- 1994–2001: South Carolina (assistant)
- 2001–2003: Winthrop (assistant)
- 2003–2004: Queens
- 2004–2005: Miami (FL) (assistant)
- 2005–2023: Charleston Southern

Head coaching record
- Overall: 249–333 (.428)
- Tournaments: 0–2 (NIT); 1–1 (CIT)

Accomplishments and honors

Championships
- Big South South Division (2013); 2 Big South regular season (2013, 2015)

Awards
- 2× Big South Coach of the Year (2012, 2015)

Barclay Radebaugh (born September 14, 1965) is an American college basketball coach. He is the former head coach of the men's basketball team at Charleston Southern University.

Radebaugh is a two-time Big South Conference Coach of the Year (2012, 2015). In 2015, he led Charleston Southern to the regular season Big South Conference title and the most regular season wins in program history (19).

== Head coaching record ==
Record table
Season	Team	Overall	Conference	Standing	Postseason
Queens Royals (Conference Carolinas) (2003–2004)
2003–04	Queens	21–8	15–5	T–2nd	
Queens:		21–8 (.724)	15–5 (.750)		
Charleston Southern Buccaneers (Big South Conference) (2005–2023)
2005–06	Charleston Southern	13–16	7–9	6th	
2006–07	Charleston Southern	8–22	2–12	8th	
2007–08	Charleston Southern	10–20	4–10	8th	
2008–09	Charleston Southern	9–20	4–14	8th	
2009–10	Charleston Southern	13–17	7–11	7th	
2010–11	Charleston Southern	16–16	9–9	T–5th	
2011–12	Charleston Southern	19–11	11–7	3rd	
2012–13	Charleston Southern	19–13	12–4	1st (South)	NIT First Round
2013–14	Charleston Southern	13–18	6–10	5th (South)	
2014–15	Charleston Southern	19–12	13–5	T–1st	NIT First Round
2015–16	Charleston Southern	9–21	5–13	T–8th	
2016–17	Charleston Southern	12–19	7–11	T–7th	
2017–18	Charleston Southern	15–16	9–9	T–5th	
2018–19	Charleston Southern	18–16	9–7	T–5th	CIT Second Round
2019–20	Charleston Southern	14–18	7–11	T–7th	
2020–21	Charleston Southern	3–18	2–15	11th	
2021–22	Charleston Southern	6–25	1–15	6th (South)	
2022–23	Charleston Southern	10–21	5–13	9th	
2023–24	Charleston Southern	2–5	0–0		
Charleston Southern:		228–325 (.412)	120–185 (.393)		
Total:		249–333 (.428)			
National champion Postseason invitational champion Conference regular season champion Conference regular season and conference tournament champion Division regular season champion Division regular season and conference tournament champion Conference tournament champion
