= Chandler Vaudrin =

American basketball player (born 1997)

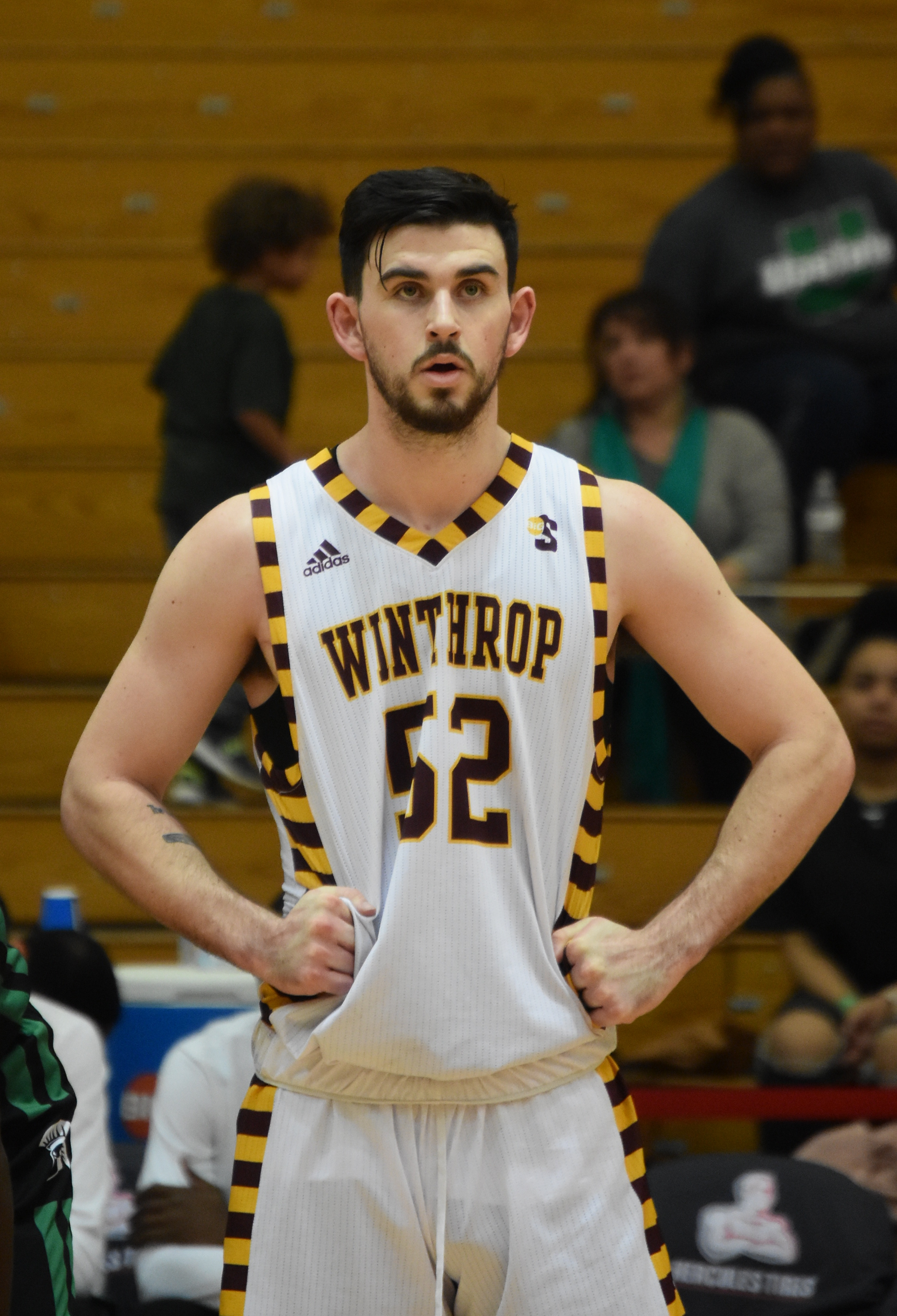
- Vaudrin with Winthrop in 2020

Free agent
- Position: Point guard / shooting guard

Personal information
- Born: June 26, 1997 (age 29)
- Listed height: 6 ft 7 in (2.01 m)
- Listed weight: 210 lb (95 kg)

Career information
- High school: Lake (Uniontown, Ohio)
- College: Walsh (2016–2018); Winthrop (2019–2021)
- NBA draft: 2021: undrafted
- Playing career: 2021–present

Career history
- 2022–2023: Cleveland Charge
- 2023: Edmonton Stingers
- 2023–2024: Motor City Cruise

Career highlights
- Big South Player of the Year (2021); First-team All-Big South (2021); Second-team All-Big South (2020); Big South tournament MVP (2021); First-team All-GMAC (2018)
- Stats at NBA.com
- Stats at Basketball Reference

Chandler Reed Vaudrin (born June 26, 1997) is an American professional basketball player who last played for the Motor City Cruise of the NBA G League. He played college basketball for the Walsh Cavaliers and the Winthrop Eagles.

== High school career ==
Vaudrin attended Lake High School in Uniontown, Ohio. He stood 5'10" as a freshman and grew to 6'6" by his senior year. Vaudrin was an All-Ohio Division I selection in his final two seasons. As a senior, he averaged 16.3 points and four rebounds per game, setting the school single-season record with 174 assists. Vaudrin left as Lake's all-time leader in assists and ranked fourth in points. He committed to playing college basketball for NCAA Division II program Walsh.

== College career ==
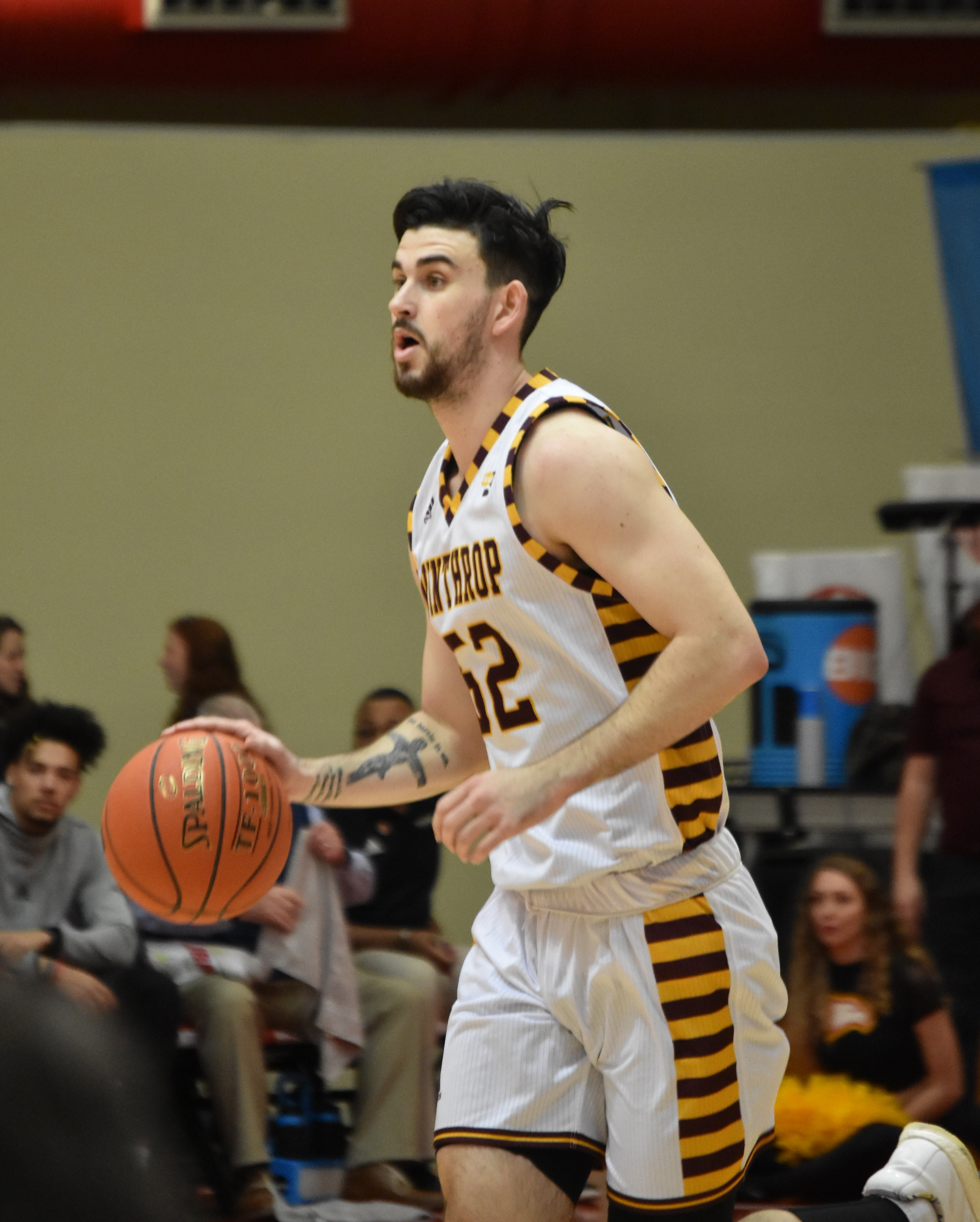
Vaudrin with Winthrop in 2020

As a freshman at Walsh, Vaudrin averaged 6.7 points and 7.8 rebounds per game. On February 10, 2018, he recorded 16 assists, a Great Midwest Athletic Conference (GMAC) single-game record, in a 102–68 win over Kentucky Wesleyan. As a sophomore, Vaudrin averaged 15.5 points, 9.3 rebounds, 7.5 assists and 2.3 steals per game, leading all divisions of college basketball with four triple-doubles. He collected First Team All-GMAC honors.

For his junior season, Vaudrin transferred to NCAA Division I program Winthrop. He sat out for one year due to transfer rules. On January 2, 2020, he recorded a triple-double of 10 points, 12 rebounds and 11 assists, as well as six steals, in a 91–67 victory over Longwood. As a junior, Vaudrin averaged 9.3 points, 5.9 rebounds and 5.8 assists per game. His 191 assists were the second-most by a Winthrop player in a single season. He was named to the Second Team All-Big South and led his team to an NCAA tournament berth.

In the third game of his senior season on December 13, 2020, Vaudrin posted a triple-double of 13 points, 11 rebounds and 14 assists in a 107–77 win over USC Upstate. On December 31, he had another triple-double, with 10 points, 13 rebounds and 10 assists in a 94–76 victory over Campbell. At the conclusion of the regular season, Vaudrin was named first-team all-conference and the Big South Player of the Year.

== Professional career ==
=== Cleveland Charge (2022–2023) ===
On July 29, 2021, Vaudrin signed an Exhibit 10 deal with the Cleveland Cavaliers of the National Basketball Association (NBA) to join their pre-season roster. He tore his ACL during a Summer League game against the New Orleans Pelicans.

On October 24, 2022, Vaudrin joined the Cleveland Charge training camp roster.

=== Edmonton Stingers (2023) ===
On May 27, 2023, Vaudrin signed with the Edmonton Stingers of the Canadian Elite Basketball League, making his debut that night against the Calgary Surge. He was released on June 13 after averaging 6.4 points per game across 5 games for the club.

=== Motor City Cruise (2023–2024) ===
On October 30, 2023, Vaudrin joined the Motor City Cruise.
