= 2021 Big South Conference men's basketball tournament =

- Classification: Division I
- Season: 2020–21
- Teams: 10
- Site: Campus sites
- Champions: Winthrop (13th title)
- Winning coach: Pat Kelsey (3rd title)
- MVP: Chandler Vaudrin (Winthrop)
- Television: ESPN3, ESPN+, ESPN

2020–21 Big South men's basketball standings
	Conf.				Overall
Team	W		L	PCT	W		L	PCT
Winthrop †	17	–	1	.944	23	–	2	.920
Radford	12	–	6	.667	15	–	12	.556
Campbell	11	–	6	.647	17	–	10	.630
UNC Asheville	9	–	5	.643	10	–	10	.500
Longwood	10	–	10	.500	12	–	17	.414
Gardner–Webb	10	–	10	.500	11	–	15	.423
Hampton	9	–	9	.500	11	–	14	.440
High Point	6	–	11	.353	9	–	15	.375
USC Upstate	5	–	11	.313	5	–	18	.217
Presbyterian	5	–	12	.294	7	–	15	.318
Charleston Southern	2	–	15	.118	3	–	18	.143
† 2021 Big South tournament winner Charleston Southern suspended their season on February 23, 2021.

The 2021 Big South men's basketball tournament was the postseason men's basketball tournament that ended the 2020–21 NCAA Division I men's basketball season of the Big South Conference. It was held from February 27 through March 7, 2021 and all tournament games were played on home arenas of the higher-seeded school. The tournament winner received the automatic bid to the NCAA tournament.

== Seeds ==
All of the conference teams, except for Charleston Southern, competed in the tournament. Charleston Southern cancelled their season after going 3–18 due to contact tracing, so they did not compete in the conference tournament. The top six teams received a first-round bye. Teams were seeded by record within the conference, with a tiebreaker system to seed teams with identical conference records.

The tiebreakers operate in the following order:

1. Head-to-head record.
2. Record against the top-ranked conference team not involved in the tie, going down the standings until the tie is broken. For this purpose, teams with the same conference record are considered collectively. If two teams were unbeaten or winless against an opponent but did not play the same number of games against that opponent, the tie is not considered broken.

Seed	School	Conference	Overall	Tiebreaker 1	Tiebreaker 2
1	Winthrop	17–1			
2	Radford	12–6			
3	Campbell	11–6			
4	UNC Asheville	9–5			
5	Longwood	10–10		3-1 vs. Gardner–Webb/Hampton	
6	Gardner–Webb	10–10		1-3 vs. Longwood/Hampton; 2-0 vs. Radford	
7	Hampton	9–9		2-2 vs. Longwood/Gardner-Webb; 0-2 vs. Radford	
8	High Point	6–11			
9	USC Upstate	5–11			
10	Presbyterian	5–12			

== Schedule ==
Game	Time*	Matchup	Score	Channel
Opening round - Saturday, February 27 Campus sites
1	2:00 pm	No. 10 Presbyterian at No. 7 Hampton	65–67	ESPN3
2	4:00 pm	No. 9 SC Upstate at No. 8 High Point	60–65	ESPN3
Quarterfinals - Monday, March 1 Campus sites
3	6:00 pm	No. 8 High Point at No. 1 Winthrop	54–83	ESPN3
4	6:00 pm	No. 7 Hampton at No. 2 Radford	52–67	ESPN3
5	7:00 pm	No. 6 Gardner-Webb at No. 3 Campbell	57–63	ESPN3
6	7:00 pm	No. 5 Longwood at No. 4 NC Asheville	77–61	ESPN3
Semifinals - Thursday, March 4 at highest remaining seeds
7	8:00 pm	No. 3 Campbell at No. 2 Radford	78–60	ESPN+
8	7:00 pm	No. 5 Longwood at No. 1 Winthrop	61–82	ESPN+
Championship - Sunday, March 7 at highest remaining seed
9	12:00 pm	No. 3 Campbell at No. 1 Winthrop	53–80	ESPN
*Game times in ET

== Bracket ==
First round Saturday, February 27; ESPN3
8	High Point	65
9	USC Upstate	60
7	Hampton	67
10	Presbyterian	65

Quarterfinals; Monday, March 1 ESPN3
1	Winthrop	83
8	High Point	54
4	UNC Asheville	61
5	Longwood	77
2	Radford	67
7	Hampton	52
3	Campbell	63
6	Gardner–Webb	57

Semifinals; Thursday, March 4 ESPN+
1	Winthrop	82
5	Longwood	61
2	Radford	60
3	Campbell	78

Championship; Sunday, March 7 ESPN
1	Winthrop	80
3	Campbell	53
