= 2018–19 Radford Highlanders men's basketball team =

American college basketball season

2018–19 Radford Highlanders men's basketball
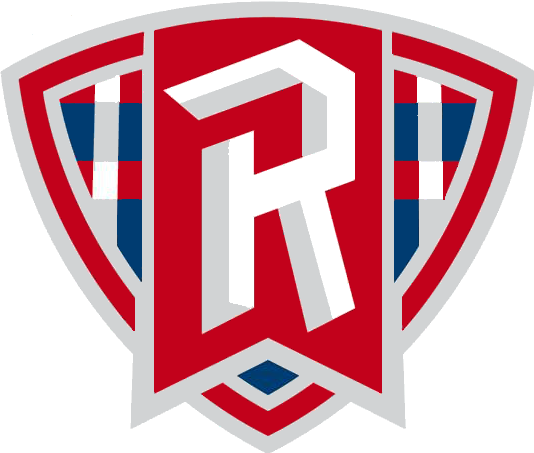

Big South regular season co-champions
- Conference: Big South Conference
- Record: 22–11 (12–4 Big South)
- Head coach: Mike Jones (8th season)
- Assistant coaches: Ron Jirsa; David Boyden; Donny Lind
- Home arena: Dedmon Center

2018–19 Big South men's basketball standings
	Conf.				Overall
Team	W		L	PCT	W		L	PCT
Campbell	12	–	4	.750	20	–	13	.606
Radford	12	–	4	.750	22	–	11	.667
Winthrop	10	–	6	.625	18	–	12	.600
Gardner–Webb †	10	–	6	.625	23	–	12	.657
High Point	9	–	7	.563	16	–	15	.516
Charleston Southern	9	–	7	.563	18	–	16	.529
Presbyterian	9	–	7	.563	20	–	16	.556
Hampton	9	–	7	.563	18	–	17	.514
Longwood	5	–	11	.313	16	–	18	.471
UNC Asheville	2	–	14	.125	4	–	27	.129
USC Upstate	1	–	15	.063	6	–	26	.188
† 2019 Big South tournament winner

The 2018–19 Radford Highlanders men's basketball team represented Radford University during the 2018–19 NCAA Division I men's basketball season. The Highlanders, led by eighth-year head coach Mike Jones, played their home games at the Dedmon Center in Radford, Virginia as members of the Big South Conference.

== Previous season ==
The Highlanders finished the season 23–13, 12–6 in Big South play to finish in a tie for second place. They defeated Longwood, Winthrop, and Liberty to become champions of the Big South tournament. The received the Big South's automatic bid to the NCAA tournament where they defeated LIU Brooklyn in the First Four before losing in the first round to Villanova.

== Roster ==
2018–19 Radford Highlanders men's basketball team
Players
Coaches

Pos.	#	Name	Height	Weight	Year	Hometown
G	0	Devin Hutchinson	6 ft 5 in (1.96 m)	195 lb (88 kg)	RS Jr	Charlotte, North Carolina
G	1	Carlik Jones	6 ft 0 in (1.83 m)	180 lb (82 kg)	RS So	Cincinnati, Ohio
F	2	Tristan Owens	6 ft 5 in (1.96 m)	205 lb (93 kg)	Sr	Orlando, Florida
G	3	Cle'Von Greene	6 ft 1 in (1.85 m)	175 lb (79 kg)	Fr	Williamsburg, Virginia
G	4	Josiah Jeffers	6 ft 1 in (1.85 m)	160 lb (73 kg)	Fr	Burlington, North Carolina
G	5	Donald Hicks	6 ft 3 in (1.91 m)	200 lb (91 kg)	Jr	Chesapeake, Virginia
G	10	Caleb Tanner	6 ft 1 in (1.85 m)	180 lb (82 kg)	Sr	Floyd, Virginia
G	11	Travis Fields Jr.	5 ft 10 in (1.78 m)	170 lb (77 kg)	Jr	Portsmouth, Virginia
G	12	John Caldwell	6 ft 5 in (1.96 m)	200 lb (91 kg)	RS Jr	Spartanburg, South Carolina
F	13	Leroy Butts IV	6 ft 7 in (2.01 m)	210 lb (95 kg)	So	Washington, D.C.
F	15	Devonnte Holland	6 ft 7 in (2.01 m)	240 lb (109 kg)	Jr	Martinsville, Virginia
F/C	20	Mawdo Sallah	6 ft 8 in (2.03 m)	230 lb (104 kg)	Sr	Latri Kunda, Gambia
C	22	Lewis Djonkam	6 ft 9 in (2.06 m)	245 lb (111 kg)	So	Springfield, Virginia
G	23	Anias Saunders	6 ft 2 in (1.88 m)	195 lb (88 kg)	RS So	Culpeper, Virginia
F	24	Ed Polite, Jr.	6 ft 5 in (1.96 m)	225 lb (102 kg)	Sr	Lanham, Maryland

Head coach

- Mike Jones (Howard)

Assistant coach(es)

- Ron Jirsa (Gettysburg)
- David Boyden (Western Kentucky)
- Donny Lind (Loyola (MD))

Legend

- (C) Team captain
- (S) Suspended
- (I) Ineligible
- (W) Walk-on
- Injured
- Current redshirt

Roster
Last update: October 25, 2018

== Schedule and results ==
Date time, TV	Rank^{#}	Opponent^{#}	Result	Record	Site (attendance) city, state
Exhibition
Nov 2, 2018*; 7:00 pm		Washington and Lee	W 75–54		Dedmon Center (653); Radford, VA
Non-conference regular season
Nov 6, 2018*; 7:00 pm, ESPN+		Davis & Elkins	W 91–57	1–0	Dedmon Center (1,215); Radford, VA
Nov 9, 2018*; 9:00 pm, ESPN+		UIC; Gotham Classic	W 88–78	2–0	Dedmon Center (1,477); Radford, VA
Nov 14, 2018*; 7:00 pm, ACCN Extra		at Notre Dame; Gotham Classic	W 63–60	3–0	Edmund P. Joyce Center (5,988); South Bend, IN
Nov 17, 2018*; 12:00 pm, ESPN+		at Duquesne; Gotham Classic	L 64–69	3–1	Palumbo Center (1,020); Pittsburgh, PA
Nov 20, 2018*; 7:00 pm		at William & Mary; Gotham Classic	W 81–72	4–1	Kaplan Arena (3,370); Williamsburg, VA
Nov 26, 2018*; 7:00 pm, ESPN+		Glenville State	W 102–69	5–1	Dedmon Center (1,287); Radford, VA
Nov 30, 2018*; 7:00 pm, LHN		at No. 17 Texas	W 62–59	6–1	Frank Erwin Center (8,137); Austin, TX
Dec 4, 2018*; 7:00 pm		at James Madison	L 66–73	6–2	JMU Convocation Center (2,482); Harrisonburg, VA
Dec 8, 2018*; 3:30 pm, ESPN3		at Ohio	L 69–78	6–3	Convocation Center (5,974); Athens, OH
Dec 15, 2018*; 3:00 pm, ACCN Extra		at Clemson	L 66–74	6–4	Littlejohn Coliseum (7,225); Clemson, SC
Dec 18, 2018*; 7:00 pm, ESPN+		at UNC Greensboro	L 58–65	6–5	Greensboro, NC (2,059); Greensboro, NC
Dec 21, 2018*; 7:00 pm, ESPN+		Georgia Southern	W 80–68	7–5	Dedmon Center (1,012); Radford, VA
Dec 29, 2018*; 6:00 pm, ESPNU		at Maryland	L 64–78	7–6	Xfinity Center (13,608); College Park, MD
Jan 1, 2019*; 3:00 pm, ESPN+		Mars Hill	W 80–51	8–6	Dedmon Center (893); Radford, VA
Big South Conference regular season
Jan 5, 2019; 4:30 pm, ESPN+		Longwood	W 71–64	9–6 (1–0)	Dedmon Center (1,411); Radford, VA
Jan 10, 2019; 7:00 pm, ESPN+		at USC Upstate	W 79–72	10–6 (2–0)	G. B. Hodge Center (394); Spartanburg, SC
Jan 12, 2019; 4:30 pm, ESPN+		Presbyterian	W 79–77	11–6 (3–0)	Dedmon Center (959); Radford, VA
Jan 17, 2019; 9:00 pm, ESPNU		Gardner–Webb	W 75–58	12–6 (4–0)	Dedmon Center (1,315); Radford, VA
Jan 19, 2019; 4:30 pm, ESPN+		at UNC Asheville	W 71–63	13–6 (5–0)	Kimmel Arena (2,314); Asheville, NC
Jan 21, 2019; 7:00 pm, ESPN+		at Longwood	W 72–59	14–6 (6–0)	Willett Hall (1,642); Farmville, VA
Jan 24, 2019; 7:00 pm, ESPN+		Charleston Southern	W 86–78	15–6 (7–0)	Dedmon Center (2,107); Radford, VA
Jan 30, 2019; 7:00 pm, ESPN+		Campbell	L 67–68	15–7 (7–1)	Dedmon Center (2,208); Radford, VA
Feb 2, 2019; 2:00 pm, ESPN+		at Winthrop	W 80–61	16–7 (8–1)	Winthrop Coliseum (2,681); Rock Hill, SC
Feb 7, 2019; 7:00 pm, ESPNU		at Hampton	W 101–98	17–7 (9–1)	Hampton Convocation Center (6,523); Hampton, VA
Feb 9, 2019; 4:00 pm, ESPN+		High Point	W 69–66	18–7 (10–1)	Dedmon Center (1,610); Radford, VA
Feb 16, 2019; 5:30 pm, ESPN3		at Charleston Southern	L 52–53	18–8 (10–2)	CSU Field House (787); North Charleston, SC
Feb 21, 2019; 7:00 pm, ESPN+		Winthrop	W 87–81	19–8 (11–2)	Dedmon Center (2,072); Radford, VA
Feb 23, 2019; 5:00 pm, ESPN+		Hampton	L 71–74	19–9 (11–3)	Dedmon Center (2,704); Radford, VA
Feb 27, 2019; 7:00 pm, ESPN+		at High Point	W 72–54	20–9 (12–3)	Millis Center (1,241); High Point, NC
Mar 2, 2019; 2:00 pm, ESPN3		at Campbell	W 64–62	20–10 (12–4)	Gore Arena (3,351); Buies Creek, NC
Big South tournament
Mar 7, 2019; 12:00 pm, ESPN3	(2)	vs. (7) Presbyterian; Quarterfinals	W 84–76	21–10	Gore Arena (1,460); Buies Creek, NC
Mar 8, 2019; 6:00 pm, ESPN+	(2)	vs. (6) Charleston Southern; Semifinals	W 63–54	22–10	Gore Arena (3,090); Buies Creek, NC
Mar 10, 2019; 1:00 pm, ESPN	(2)	(4) Gardner–Webb; Championship game	L 65–76	22–11	Dedmon Center (2,772); Radford, VA
*Non-conference game. ^{#}Rankings from AP Poll. (#) Tournament seedings in parentheses. E=East Source. All times are in Eastern Time.
