= 2018–19 Gardner–Webb Runnin' Bulldogs men's basketball team =

American college basketball season

2018–19 Gardner–Webb Runnin' Bulldogs men's basketball
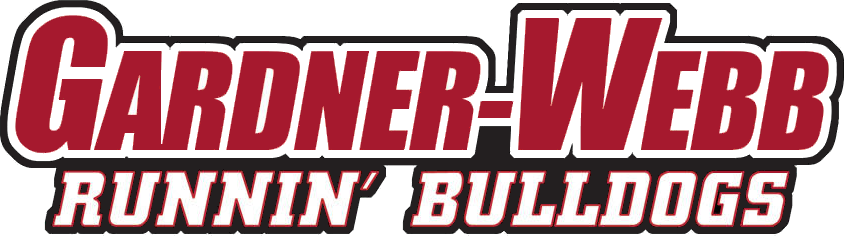

Big South tournament champions

NCAA tournament, First Round
- Conference: Big South Conference
- Record: 23–12 (10–6 Big South)
- Head coach: Tim Craft (6th season)
- Assistant coaches: Jeremy Luther; Paul Hemrick; Ronrico White
- Home arena: Paul Porter Arena

2018–19 Big South men's basketball standings
	Conf.				Overall
Team	W		L	PCT	W		L	PCT
Campbell	12	–	4	.750	20	–	13	.606
Radford	12	–	4	.750	22	–	11	.667
Winthrop	10	–	6	.625	18	–	12	.600
Gardner–Webb †	10	–	6	.625	23	–	12	.657
High Point	9	–	7	.563	16	–	15	.516
Charleston Southern	9	–	7	.563	18	–	16	.529
Presbyterian	9	–	7	.563	20	–	16	.556
Hampton	9	–	7	.563	18	–	17	.514
Longwood	5	–	11	.313	16	–	18	.471
UNC Asheville	2	–	14	.125	4	–	27	.129
USC Upstate	1	–	15	.063	6	–	26	.188
† 2019 Big South tournament winner

The 2018–19 Gardner–Webb Runnin' Bulldogs men's basketball team represented Gardner–Webb University during the 2018–19 NCAA Division I men's basketball season. The Runnin' Bulldogs, led by sixth-year head coach Tim Craft, played their home games at the Paul Porter Arena in Boiling Springs, North Carolina as members of the Big South Conference. They finished the season 23–12, 10–6 in Big South play to finish in a tie for third place. They defeated High Point, Campbell and Radford to be champions of the Big South tournament. They earned the Big South's automatic-bid to the NCAA tournament, their first NCAA Tournament bid in school history, where they lost in the first round to Virginia.

== Previous season ==
The Runnin' Bulldogs finished the 2017–18 season 14–18, 9–9 in Big South play to finish in a four-way tie for fifth place. As the No. 6 seed in the Big South tournament, they lost to Winthrop in the quarterfinals.

== Roster ==
2018–19 Gardner–Webb Runnin' Bulldogs men's basketball team
Players
Coaches

Pos.	#	Name	Height	Weight	Year	Hometown
F	0	Jaylen Alston	6 ft 4 in (1.93 m)	190 lb (86 kg)	RS Fr	Greensboro, North Carolina
G	1	Jaheam Cornwall	6 ft 0 in (1.83 m)	175 lb (79 kg)	RS So	Brooklyn, New York
F	2	Eric Jamison, Jr.	6 ft 6 in (1.98 m)	185 lb (84 kg)	RS Jr	East Point, Georgia
G	3	Justin Jenkins	6 ft 2 in (1.88 m)	200 lb (91 kg)	RS Jr	Knoxville, Tennessee
G	4	Christian Turner	5 ft 10 in (1.78 m)	180 lb (82 kg)	Jr	Atlanta, Georgia
G/F	5	Jose Perez	6 ft 5 in (1.96 m)	195 lb (88 kg)	Fr	Bronx, New York
G	10	Nate Johnson	6 ft 4 in (1.93 m)	180 lb (82 kg)	RS So	Miami, Florida
G	11	David Efianayi	6 ft 2 in (1.88 m)	185 lb (84 kg)	RS Sr	Orlando, Florida
C	14	Brandon Miller	6 ft 6 in (1.98 m)	240 lb (109 kg)	RS Sr	Orlando, Florida
F	15	Erick Valdez	6 ft 7 in (2.01 m)	200 lb (91 kg)	Fr	San Cristóbal, Dominican Republic
F	24	Ludovic Dufeal	6 ft 8 in (2.03 m)	185 lb (84 kg)	Fr	Saint-Joseph, Martinique
F	25	DJ Laster	6 ft 6 in (1.98 m)	230 lb (104 kg)	Sr	Pensacola, Florida
C	32	Gabe Bryant	6 ft 9 in (2.06 m)	250 lb (113 kg)	Fr	Spartanburg, South Carolina

Head coach

- Tim Craft (Florida)

Assistant coach(es)

- Jeremy Luther (North Greenville)
- Paul Hemrick (Georgia)
- Ronrico White (Chattanooga)

Legend

- (C) Team captain
- (S) Suspended
- (I) Ineligible
- (W) Walk-on
- Injured
- Current redshirt

Roster
Last update: October 25, 2018

== Schedule and results ==
Date time, TV	Rank^{#}	Opponent^{#}	Result	Record	Site (attendance) city, state
Non-conference regular season
Nov 6, 2018*; 7:00 pm, MASN		at VCU	L 57–69	0–1	Siegel Center (7,637); Richmond, VA
Nov 9, 2018*; 7:00 pm, ACCN Extra		at No. 15 Virginia Tech	L 59–87	0–2	Cassell Coliseum (7,736); Blacksburgh, VA
Nov 13, 2018*; 7:00 pm, ESPN+		at Furman	L 86–88 ^{OT}	0–3	Timmons Arena (1,104); Greenville, SC
Nov 16, 2018*; 7:00 pm		at Savannah State	W 97–77	1–3	Tiger Arena (755); Savannah, GA
Nov 23, 2018*; 5:00 pm		vs. Eastern Illinois; Battle in the Blue Ridge	L 78–79	1–4	U.S. Cellular Center (1,280); Asheville, NC
Nov 24, 2018*; 7:30 pm		vs. UNC Wilmington; Battle in the Blue Ridge	W 81–72	2–4	U.S. Cellular Center (1,250); Asheville, NC
Nov 25, 2018*; 3:30 pm		vs. Arkansas State; Battle in the Blue Ridge	L 69–77	2–5	U.S. Cellular Center (1,037); Asheville, NC
Nov 28, 2018*; 7:00 pm, ESPN+		at USC Upstate	W 74–61	3–5	G. B. Hodge Center (635); Spartanburg, SC
Dec 1, 2018*; 3:00 pm, ESPN+		Savannah State	W 97–60	4–5	Paul Porter Arena (1,559); Boiling Springs, NC
Dec 6, 2018*; 11:00 am, ESPN+		Bob Jones; Battle in the Blue Ridge	W 105–37	5–5	Paul Porter Arena (690); Boiling Springs, NC
Dec 8, 2018*; 3:00 pm, ESPN+		Johnson & Wales (NC)	W 102–55	6–5	Paul Porter Arena (1,005); Boiling Springs, NC
Dec 13, 2018*; 5:00 pm, ESPN+		Kennesaw State	W 81–77 ^{OT}	7–5	Paul Porter Arena (1,069); Boiling Springs, NC
Dec 17, 2018*; 7:30 pm, ACCN Extra		at Georgia Tech	W 79–69	8–5	McCamish Pavilion (4,268); Atlanta, GA
Dec 19, 2018*; 4:30 pm, ESPN+		Brevard	W 106–29	9–5	Paul Porter Arena (875); Boiling Springs, NC
Dec 29, 2018*; 2:00 pm, ACCN Extra		at Wake Forest	W 73–69	10–5	LJVM Coliseum (5,975); Winston-Salem, NC
Big South regular season
Jan 5, 2019; 4:30 pm, ESPN+		at Campbell	L 61–72	10–6 (0–1)	Gore Arena (1,983); Buies Creek, NC
Jan 12, 2019; 5:00 pm, ESPN+		USC Upstate	W 64–59	11–6 (1–1)	Paul Porter Arena (1,750); Boiling Springs, NC
Jan 17, 2019; 9:00 pm, ESPNU		at Radford	L 58–75	11–7 (1–2)	Dedmon Center (1,215); Radford, VA
Jan 19, 2019; 7:00 pm, ESPN+		Hampton	W 87–74 ^{OT}	12–7 (2–2)	Paul Porter Arena (1,250); Boiling Springs, NC
Jan 24, 2019; 7:00 pm, ESPN+		at Winthrop	L 88–97	12–8 (2–3)	Winthrop Coliseum (2,864); Rock Hill, SC
Jan 26, 2019; 5:30 pm, ESPN+		at Charleston Southern	L 60–74	12–9 (2–4)	CSU Field House (628); North Charleston, SC
Jan 30, 2019; 7:00 pm, ESPN+		High Point	W 69–67	13–9 (3–4)	Paul Porter Arena (985); Boiling Springs, NC
Feb 2, 2019; 3:00 pm, ESPN+		UNC Asheville	W 82–81 ^{OT}	14–9 (4–4)	Paul Porter Arena (1,785); Boiling Springs, NC
Feb 7, 2019; 7:00 pm, ESPN+		at Longwood	W 89–88 ^{OT}	15–9 (5–4)	Willett Hall (1,472); Farmville, VA
Feb 9, 2019; 4:30 pm, ESPN+		at Presbyterian	L 101–103 ^{OT}	15–10 (5–5)	Templeton Physical Education Center (596); Clinton, SC
Feb 13, 2019; 7:00 pm, ESPN+		Charleston Southern	W 77–74	16–10 (6–5)	Paul Porter Arena (1,150); Boiling Springs, NC
Feb 16, 2019; 5:00 pm, ESPN+		Winthrop	W 64–60	17–10 (7–5)	Paul Porter Arena (2,049); Boiling Springs, NC
Feb 21, 2019; 9:00 p.m., ESPN+		at UNC Asheville	W 65–55	18–10 (8–5)	Kimmel Arena (1,763); Asheville, NC
Feb 23, 2019; 7:00 pm, ESPN+		at High Point	L 79–87	18–11 (8–6)	Millis Athletic Convocation Center (1,202); High Point, NC
Feb 27, 2019; 7:00 pm, ESPN+		Presbyterian	W 78–70	19–11 (9–6)	Paul Porter Arena (1,285); Boiling Springs, NC
Mar 2, 2019; 3:00 pm, ESPN+		Longwood	W 66–47	20–11 (10–6)	Paul Porter Arena (1,590); Boiling Springs, NC
Big South tournament
Mar 7, 2019; 8:00 pm, ESPN3	(4)	vs. (5) High Point; Quarterfinals	W 75–69	21–11	Gore Arena (2,948); Buies Creek, NC
Mar 7, 2019; 8:00 pm, ESPN+	(4)	at (1) Campbell; Semifinals	W 79–74	22–11	Gore Arena (3,090); Buies Creek, NC
Mar 10, 2019; 1:00 pm, ESPN	(4)	at (2) Radford; Championship	W 76–65	23–11	Dedmon Center (2,772); Radford, VA
NCAA tournament
Mar 22, 2019*; 3:10 pm, truTV	(16 S)	vs. (1 S) No. 2 Virginia; First Round	L 56–71	23–12	Colonial Life Arena (15,417); Columbia, SC
*Non-conference game. ^{#}Rankings from AP Poll. (#) Tournament seedings in parentheses. S=South. All times are in Eastern Time Source.

Despite both being members of the Big South for the season, Gardner-Webb’s meeting with USC Upstate on November 28 was considered a non-conference game. This game was scheduled prior to USC Upstate joining the conference. Their meeting on January 12, however, was considered a conference game.
