= 2018–19 Campbell Fighting Camels men's basketball team =

American college basketball season

2018–19 Campbell Fighting Camels men's basketball
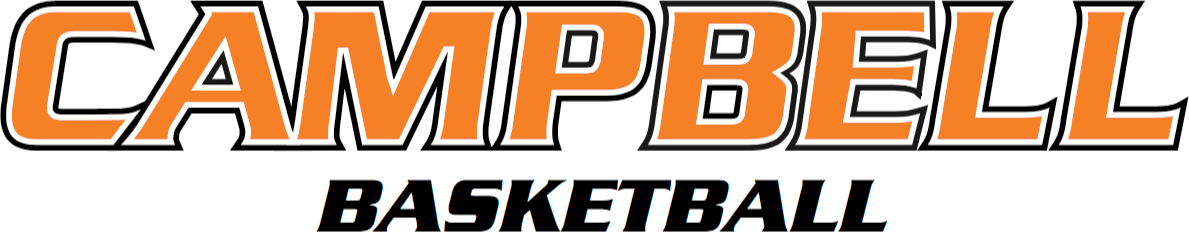

Big South regular season co-champions

NIT, First Round
- Conference: Big South Conference
- Record: 20–13 (12–4 Big South)
- Head coach: Kevin McGeehan (6th season)
- Assistant coaches: Peter Thomas; Kevin Smith; Kenneth White
- Home arena: Gore Arena

2018–19 Big South men's basketball standings
	Conf.				Overall
Team	W		L	PCT	W		L	PCT
Campbell	12	–	4	.750	20	–	13	.606
Radford	12	–	4	.750	22	–	11	.667
Winthrop	10	–	6	.625	18	–	12	.600
Gardner–Webb †	10	–	6	.625	23	–	12	.657
High Point	9	–	7	.563	16	–	15	.516
Charleston Southern	9	–	7	.563	18	–	16	.529
Presbyterian	9	–	7	.563	20	–	16	.556
Hampton	9	–	7	.563	18	–	17	.514
Longwood	5	–	11	.313	16	–	18	.471
UNC Asheville	2	–	14	.125	4	–	27	.129
USC Upstate	1	–	15	.063	6	–	26	.188
† 2019 Big South tournament winner

The 2018–19 Campbell Fighting Camels men's basketball team represented Campbell University during the 2018–19 NCAA Division I men's basketball season. The Fighting Camels, led by sixth-year head coach Kevin McGeehan played their home games at Gore Arena in Buies Creek, North Carolina as members of the Big South Conference. They finished the season 20–13, 12–4 in Big South play to win a share of the regular season championship with Radford. They defeated Hampton in the quarterfinals of the Big South tournament before losing in the semifinals to Gardner–Webb. As a regular season conference champion and No. 1 seed in their conference tournament who failed to win their conference tournament, they received an automatic-bid to the National Invitation Tournament where they lost in the first round to UNC Greensboro.

== Previous season ==
The Fighting Camels finished the season 18–16, 10–8 in Big South play to finish in fourth place. They lost to Liberty in the quarterfinals of the Big South tournament. They were invited to the College Basketball Invitational where they defeated Miami (OH) and New Orleans before losing in the semifinals to San Francisco.

== Roster ==
2018–19 Campbell Fighting Camels men's basketball team
Players
Coaches

Pos.	#	Name	Height	Weight	Year	Hometown
G	0	Trey Spencer	6 ft 4 in (1.93 m)	180 lb (82 kg)	Jr	Grenada, Mississippi
G	1	Ricky Clemons	6 ft 2 in (1.88 m)	180 lb (82 kg)	Fr	Rolesville, North Carolina
G	2	Ja'Cor Nelson	6 ft 3 in (1.91 m)	185 lb (84 kg)	So	Hopkins, South Carolina
G	3	Chris Clemons	5 ft 9 in (1.75 m)	180 lb (82 kg)	Sr	Raleigh, North Carolina
G/F	4	Noah Saunders	6 ft 6 in (1.98 m)	195 lb (88 kg)	Jr	Pittsburgh, Pennsylvania
F	5	Austin Burnette	6 ft 7 in (2.01 m)	220 lb (100 kg)	Jr	Raleigh, North Carolina
F	10	Miloš Stajčić	6 ft 10 in (2.08 m)	230 lb (104 kg)	Sr	Belgrade, Serbia
G	11	Jordan Whitfield	6 ft 1 in (1.85 m)	175 lb (79 kg)	So	Raleigh, North Carolina
F	12	Jon Ander Cuadra	6 ft 8 in (2.03 m)	210 lb (95 kg)	Sr	Vitoria-Gasteiz, Spain
G	13	Billy Phenicie	6 ft 3 in (1.91 m)	185 lb (84 kg)	RS So	The Woodlands, Texas
G/F	15	Ladarius Knight	6 ft 5 in (1.96 m)	190 lb (86 kg)	Fr	Ashford, Alabama
G	20	Dan Gross	6 ft 2 in (1.88 m)	160 lb (73 kg)	Fr	High Point, North Carolina
F	21	Brooks Cluxton	6 ft 8 in (2.03 m)	190 lb (86 kg)	So	Oviedo, Florida
G	22	Cory Gensler	6 ft 4 in (1.93 m)	190 lb (86 kg)	Jr	Cary, North Carolina
G/F	24	Isaac Chatman	6 ft 6 in (1.98 m)	185 lb (84 kg)	Fr	Jasper, Alabama
F	25	Andrew Eudy	6 ft 7 in (2.01 m)	210 lb (95 kg)	Sr	Lebanon, Pennsylvania

Head coach

- Kevin McGeehan (Gettysburg)

Assistant coach(es)

- Peter Thomas (Richmond)
- Kevin Smith (Richmond)
- Kenneth White (North Carolina)

Legend

- (C) Team captain
- (S) Suspended
- (I) Ineligible
- (W) Walk-on
- Injured
- Current redshirt

Roster
Last update: October 25, 2018

== Schedule and results ==
Date time, TV	Rank^{#}	Opponent^{#}	Result	Record	Site (attendance) city, state
Exhibition
Oct 27, 2018*; 12:00 pm		Belmont Abbey	W 83–56		Gore Arena; Buies Creek, NC
Non-conference regular season
Nov 6, 2018*; 7:30 pm, ESPN+		UNC Wilmington	W 97–93 ^{OT}	1–0	Gore Arena (2,416); Buies Creek, NC
Nov 9, 2018*; 7:30 pm, ESPN+		Coastal Carolina	L 75–85	1–1	Gore Arena (1,757); Buies Creek, NC
Nov 12, 2018*; 7:00 pm, ESPN3		at Ohio; Jamaica Classic	L 73–81	1–2	Convocation Center (4,312); Athens, OH
Nov 16, 2018*; 2:00 pm, CBSSN		vs. Florida A&M; Jamaica Classic	W 66–59	2–2	Montego Bay Convention Centre; Montego Bay, Jamaica
Nov 18, 2018*; 2:00 pm, CBSSN		vs. Austin Peay; Jamaica Classic	W 78–72	3–2	Montego Bay Convention Centre; Montego Bay, Jamaica
Nov 24, 2018*; 12:00 noon, FSN/MASN2		at Georgetown; Jamaica Classic	L 85–93	3–3	Capital One Arena (6,788); Washington, D.C.
Nov 29, 2018*; 7:00 pm, ESPN+		Trinity Baptist	W 79–29	4–3	Gore Arena (1,341); Buies Creek, NC
Dec 4, 2018*; 7:00 pm, ESPN+		at Abilene Christian	L 68–83	4–4	Moody Coliseum (1,048); Abilene, TX
Dec 13, 2018*; 7:00 pm, ESPN+		Central Penn	W 100–53	5–4	Gore Arena (1,236); Buies Creek, NC
Dec 18, 2018*; 7:00 pm, ESPN+		The Citadel	L 76–82	5–5	Gore Arena (1,586); Buies Creek, NC
Dec 21, 2018*; 2:30 pm		vs. Austin Peay; St. Pete Shootout semifinals	L 75–88	5–6	McArthur Center (189); St. Petersburg, FL
Dec 22, 2018*; 12:00 pm		vs. Alabama State; St. Pete Shootout 3rd place game	W 70–69	6–6	McArthur Center (110); St. Petersburg, FL
Dec 29, 2018*; 4:00 pm, FS South		at Miami (FL)	W 73–62	6–7	Watsco Center (6,789); Coral Gables, FL
Jan 2, 2019*; 7:00 pm, ESPN+		Allen	W 95–48	7–7	Gore Arena (1,113); Buies Creek, NC
Big South regular season
Jan 5, 2019; 4:30 pm, ESPN+		Gardner–Webb	W 72–61	8–7 (1–0)	Gore Arena (1,983); Buies Creek, NC
Jan 10, 2019; 7:00 pm, ESPN+		Winthrop	W 90–86	8–8 (1–1)	Gore Arena (2,704); Buies Creek, NC
Jan 16, 2019; 7:00 pm, ESPN3		at UNC Asheville	W 70–53	9–8 (2–1)	Kimmel Arena (1,528); Asheville, NC
Jan 19, 2019; 5:30 pm, ESPN+		at Charleston Southern	W 73–72	10–8 (3–1)	CSU Field House (727); North Charleston, SC
Jan 24, 2019; 7:00 pm, ESPN+		Presbyterian	W 77–73	11–8 (4–1)	Gore Arena (1,783); Buies Creek, NC
Jan 26, 2019; 6:00 pm, ESPN+		at Hampton	L 58–64	11–9 (4–2)	Hampton Convocation Center (5,412); Hampton, VA
Jan 30, 2019; 7:00 pm, ESPN+		at Radford	W 68–67	12–9 (5–2)	Dedmon Center (2,208); Radford, VA
Feb 2, 2019; 2:00 pm, ESPN+		Longwood	W 83–62	13–9 (6–2)	Gore Arena (2,619); Buies Creek, NC
Feb 7, 2019; 7:00 pm, ESPN+		at High Point	L 56–57	13–10 (6–3)	Millis Athletic Convocation Center (1,511); High Point, NC
Feb 9, 2019; 4:30 pm, ESPN+		USC Upstate	W 82–66	14–10 (7–3)	Gore Arena (2,575); Buies Creek, NC
Feb 13, 2019; 2:00 pm, ESPN+		Hampton	W 87–84	15–10 (8–3)	Gore Arena (1,678); Buies Creek, NC
Feb 16, 2019; 4:00 pm, ESPN+		at Presbyterian	L 71–76	15–11 (8–4)	Templeton Physical Education Center (1,003); Clinton, SC
Feb 21, 2019; 7:00 pm, ESPN+		High Point	W 61–48	16–11 (9–4)	Gore Arena (2,952); Buies Creek, NC
Feb 23, 2019; 3:00 pm, ESPN+		at Longwood	W 74–72	17–11 (10–4)	Willett Hall (1,482); Farmville, VA
Feb 27, 2019; 7:00 pm, ESPN+		at USC Upstate	W 85–73	18–11 (11–4)	G. B. Hodge Center (727); Spartanburg, SC
Mar 2, 2019; 2:00 pm, ESPN3		Radford	W 64–62	19–11 (12–4)	Gore Arena (3,351); Buies Creek, NC
Big South tournament
Mar 7, 2019; 6:00 pm, ESPN3	(1)	(8) Hampton; Quarterfinals	W 86–77	20–11	Gore Arena (2,948); Buies Creek, NC
Mar 8, 2019; 8:00 pm, ESPN+	(1)	(4) Gardner–Webb; Semifinals	L 74–79	20–12	Gore Arena (3,090); Buies Creek, NC
NIT
Mar 19, 2019*; 7:00 pm, ESPN3	(8)	at (1) UNC Greensboro; First round – UNC Greensboro bracket	L 69–84	20–13	Greensboro Coliseum (4,459); Greensboro, NC
*Non-conference game. ^{#}Rankings from AP Poll. (#) Tournament seedings in parentheses. All times are in Eastern Time Source.
