= 2018–19 USC Upstate Spartans men's basketball team =

American college basketball season

2018–19 USC Upstate Spartans men's basketball
- Conference: Big South Conference
- Record: 6–26 (1–15 Big South)
- Head coach: Dave Dickerson (1st season)
- Assistant coaches: Ron Bradley; Stacey Palmore; Andrew Garcia
- Home arena: G. B. Hodge Center

2018–19 Big South men's basketball standings
	Conf.				Overall
Team	W		L	PCT	W		L	PCT
Campbell	12	–	4	.750	20	–	13	.606
Radford	12	–	4	.750	22	–	11	.667
Winthrop	10	–	6	.625	18	–	12	.600
Gardner–Webb †	10	–	6	.625	23	–	12	.657
High Point	9	–	7	.563	16	–	15	.516
Charleston Southern	9	–	7	.563	18	–	16	.529
Presbyterian	9	–	7	.563	20	–	16	.556
Hampton	9	–	7	.563	18	–	17	.514
Longwood	5	–	11	.313	16	–	18	.471
UNC Asheville	2	–	14	.125	4	–	27	.129
USC Upstate	1	–	15	.063	6	–	26	.188
† 2019 Big South tournament winner

The 2018–19 USC Upstate Spartans men's basketball team represented the University of South Carolina Upstate during the 2018–19 NCAA Division I men's basketball season. The Spartans, led by first-year head coach Dave Dickerson, played their home games at the G. B. Hodge Center in Spartanburg, South Carolina as first-year members of the Big South Conference.

== Previous season ==
The Spartans finished the 2017–18 season 7–25, 2–12 in ASUN play to finish in last place. They lost in the quarterfinals of the ASUN tournament to Florida Gulf Coast.

After the season, USC Upstate fired head coach Kyle Perry on March 1, less than five months after being named full-time head coach of the Spartans. On March 30, the school hired former Tulane head coach Dave Dickerson for the job.

This season marked the final season for USC Upstate as members of the Atlantic Sun Conference, as the school announced on November 15, 2017 that they will be moving to the Big South Conference for the 2018–19 season.

== Roster ==
2018–19 USC Upstate Spartans men's basketball team
Players
Coaches

Pos.	#	Name	Height	Weight	Year	Hometown
F	0	Malik Moore	6 ft 6 in (1.98 m)	190 lb (86 kg)	Sr	Asheville, North Carolina
G	1	Dalvin White	5 ft 10 in (1.78 m)	153 lb (69 kg)	RS Fr	Norcross, Georgia
G	2	Everette Hammond	6 ft 2 in (1.88 m)	181 lb (82 kg)	Fr	Hendersonville, North Carolina
G	3	Jure Span	6 ft 4 in (1.93 m)	175 lb (79 kg)	Jr	Litija, Slovenia
G	4	Brandon Martin	6 ft 4 in (1.93 m)	212 lb (96 kg)	Fr	Elgin, South Carolina
G/F	5	Bryson Mozone	6 ft 60 in (3.35 m)	183 lb (83 kg)	Fr	North Augusta, South Carolina
C	10	Ross Ryan	6 ft 9 in (2.06 m)	221 lb (100 kg)	Fr	Pickerington, Ohio
G	11	Deion Holmes	6 ft 2 in (1.88 m)	188 lb (85 kg)	Sr	Chesnee, South Carolina
F	14	Jordon Furlough	6 ft 7 in (2.01 m)	210 lb (95 kg)	RS Fr	Myrtle Beach, South Carolina
G	15	Pat Welch	5 ft 11 in (1.8 m)	181 lb (82 kg)	Sr	Pembroke, New Hampshire
F	22	Andrew Tate	6 ft 6 in (1.98 m)	188 lb (85 kg)	So	Spartanburg, South Carolina
G	23	Thomas Booker	6 ft 3 in (1.91 m)	178 lb (81 kg)	RS So	Bowling Green, Kentucky
G/F	34	Josh Aldrich	6 ft 7 in (2.01 m)	200 lb (91 kg)	Fr	Newport, Kentucky
C	35	Nevin Zink	6 ft 9 in (2.06 m)	219 lb (99 kg)	Fr	Newton, Connecticut

Head coach

- Dave Dickerson (Maryland)

Assistant coach(es)

- Ron Bradley (Eastern Nazarene)
- Stacey Palmore (Livingston)
- Andrew Garcia (Tulane)

Legend

- (C) Team captain
- (S) Suspended
- (I) Ineligible
- (W) Walk-on
- Injured
- Current redshirt

Roster
Last update: October 29, 2018

== Schedule and results ==
Date time, TV	Rank^{#}	Opponent^{#}	Result	Record	Site (attendance) city, state
Non-conference regular season
Nov 6, 2018*; 7:00 pm, SECN+		at South Carolina	L 52–65	0–1	Colonial Life Arena (10,145); Columbia, SC
Nov 10, 2018*; 4:00 pm, ESPN+		Brevard; Portland Classic	W 86–43	1–1	G. B. Hodge Center (781); Spartanburg, SC
Nov 14, 2018*; 7:00 pm, ESPN+		at VMI	L 72–78	1–2	Cameron Hall (826); Lexington, KY
Nov 21, 2018*; 10:00 pm, TheW.tv		at Portland; Portland Classic	L 56–73	1–3	Chiles Center (1,249); Portland, OR
Nov 23, 2018*; 7:30 pm		vs. Texas State; Portland Classic	L 50–82	1–4	Chiles Center (1,320); Portland, OR
Nov 24, 2018*; 5:30 pm		vs. Cal Poly; Portland Classic	L 74–75 ^{OT}	1–5	Chiles Center (1,303); Portland, OR
Nov 28, 2018*; 7:00 pm		Gardner–Webb	L 61–74	1–6	G. B. Hodge Center (635); Spartanburg, SC
Dec 1, 2018*; 2:00 pm		at Western Michigan	W 71–66	2–6	University Arena (1,845); Kalamazoo, MI
Dec 5, 2018*; 7:00 pm		at Eastern Kentucky	L 77–79	2–7	McBrayer Arena (2,640); Richmond, KY
Dec 8, 2018*; 4:30 pm		No. 25 Furman	L 60–74	2–8	G. B. Hodge Center (833); Spartanburg, SC
Dec 15, 2018*; 4:00 pm		South Carolina State	W 88–84	3–8	G. B. Hodge Center (665); Spartanburg, SC
Dec 19, 2018*; 11:00 am		Truett McConnell	W 85–54	4–8	G. B. Hodge Center (557); Spartanburg, SC
Dec 22, 2018*; 12:00 pm, ACCRSN		at NC State	L 71–98	4–9	PNC Arena (14,877); Raleigh, NC
Dec 29, 2018*; 4:00 pm		Coker	W 89–69	5–9	G. B. Hodge Center (338); Spartanburg, SC
Jan 2, 2019*; 7:30 pm, ACCN Extra		at Georgia Tech	L 63–79	5–10	McCamish Pavilion (4,397); Atlanta, GA
Big South Conference regular season
Jan 5, 2019; 2:00 pm, ESPN+		at Presbyterian	L 61–64	5–11 (0–1)	Templeton Physical Education Center (406); Clinton, SC
Jan 10, 2019; 7:00 pm, ESPN+		Radford	L 72–79	5–12 (0–2)	G. B. Hodge Center (394); Spartanburg, SC
Jan 12, 2019; 5:00 pm, ESPN+		at Gardner–Webb	L 59–64	5–13 (0–3)	Paul Porter Arena (1,750); Boiling Springs, NC
Jan 16, 2019; 7:00 pm, ESPN+		at High Point	L 54–71	5–14 (0–4)	Millis Center (1,486); High Point, NC
Jan 19, 2019; 4:30 pm, ESPN+		Winthrop	L 72–82	5–15 (0–5)	G. B. Hodge Center (767); Spartanburg, SC
Jan 21, 2019; 4:00 pm, ESPN+		Presbyterian	L 59–68	5–16 (0–6)	G. B. Hodge Center (644); Spartanburg, SC
Jan 24, 2019; 7:00 pm, ESPN+		at Hampton	L 70–88	5–17 (0–7)	Hampton Convocation Center (3,123); Hampton, VA
Jan 26, 2019; 4:30 pm, ESPN3		Longwood	W 80–63	6–17 (1–7)	G. B. Hodge Center (564); Spartanburg, SC
Jan 30, 2019; 7:00 pm, ESPN+		at UNC Asheville	L 62–71	6–18 (1–8)	Kimmel Arena (1,816); Asheville, NC
Feb 2, 2019; 4:30 pm, ESPN+		Charleston Southern	L 71–90	6–19 (1–9)	G. B. Hodge Center (809); Spartanburg, SC
Feb 9, 2019; 4:30 pm, ESPN+		at Campbell	L 66–82	6–20 (1–10)	Gore Arena (2,575); Buies Creek, NC
Feb 13, 2019; 7:00 pm, ESPN+		UNC Asheville	L 53–57	6–21 (1–11)	G. B. Hodge Center (550); Spartanburg, SC
Feb 16, 2019; 3:00 pm, ESPN+		at Longwood	L 79–83 ^{OT}	6–22 (1–12)	Willett Hall (1,378); Farmville, VA
Feb 21, 2019; 7:30 pm, ESPN+		at Charleston Southern	L 60–92	6–23 (1–13)	CSU Field House (812); North Charleston, SC
Feb 27, 2019; 7:00 pm, ESPN+		Campbell	L 73–85	6–24 (1–14)	G. B. Hodge Center (727); Spartanburg, SC
Mar 2, 2019; 7:00 pm, ESPN+		Hampton	L 71–92	6–25 (1–15)	G. B. Hodge Center (717); Spartanburg, SC
Big South tournament
Mar 5, 2019; 7:00 pm, ESPN3	(11)	at (6) Charleston Southern; First round	L 52–71	6–26	CSU Field House (757); North Charleston, SC
*Non-conference game. ^{#}Rankings from AP poll. (#) Tournament seedings in parentheses. All times are in Eastern Time Source.

Despite both being members of the Big South, their meeting with Gardner–Webb on November 28 will be considered a non-conference game. The game was scheduled prior to USC Upstate joining the conference. Their meeting on January 12 will be a conference game.
