= 2018–19 High Point Panthers men's basketball team =

American college basketball season

2018–19 High Point Panthers men's basketball
- Conference: Big South Conference
- Record: 16–15 (9–7 Big South)
- Head coach: Tubby Smith (1st season)
- Assistant coaches: G. G. Smith; Eric Grabriel; Keith Gatlin
- Home arena: Millis Athletic Center

2018–19 Big South men's basketball standings
	Conf.				Overall
Team	W		L	PCT	W		L	PCT
Campbell	12	–	4	.750	20	–	13	.606
Radford	12	–	4	.750	22	–	11	.667
Winthrop	10	–	6	.625	18	–	12	.600
Gardner–Webb †	10	–	6	.625	23	–	12	.657
High Point	9	–	7	.563	16	–	15	.516
Charleston Southern	9	–	7	.563	18	–	16	.529
Presbyterian	9	–	7	.563	20	–	16	.556
Hampton	9	–	7	.563	18	–	17	.514
Longwood	5	–	11	.313	16	–	18	.471
UNC Asheville	2	–	14	.125	4	–	27	.129
USC Upstate	1	–	15	.063	6	–	26	.188
† 2019 Big South tournament winner

The 2018–19 High Point Panthers men's basketball team represented High Point University during the 2018–19 NCAA Division I men's basketball season. The Panthers, led by first-year head coach Tubby Smith, played their home games at the Millis Athletic Convocation Center as members of the Big South Conference.

== Previous season ==
The Panthers finished the season 14–16, 9–9 in Big South play to finish in a four-way tie for fifth place. As a 7 seed, they lost to Longwood in the first round of the Big South tournament.

On March 7, 2018, head coach Scott Cherry and the school mutually agreed to part ways. On March 26, it was reported that the school had hired High Point alumnus Tubby Smith as head coach.

== Roster ==
2018–19 High Point Panthers men's basketball team
Players
Coaches

Pos.	#	Name	Height	Weight	Year	Hometown
G	1	Brandonn Kamga	6 ft 5 in (1.96 m)	215 lb (98 kg)	RS Jr	Reston, Virginia
G	2	Denny Slay	5 ft 11 in (1.8 m)	194 lb (88 kg)	So	Woodbridge, Virginia
G	3	Jamal Wright	5 ft 11 in (1.8 m)	180 lb (82 kg)	Jr	Upper Marlboro, Maryland
G	4	Tim Cameron	6 ft 4 in (1.93 m)	190 lb (86 kg)	RS So	Norcross, Georgia
G	5	Curtis Holland III	6 ft 2 in (1.88 m)	217 lb (98 kg)	Fr	Churchton, Maryland
G	12	Dexter Gooding	6 ft 4 in (1.93 m)	195 lb (88 kg)	Sr	Daytona Beach, Florida
G	13	Jahaad Proctor	6 ft 3 in (1.91 m)	215 lb (98 kg)	RS Jr	Harrisburg, Pennsylvania
C	14	Othello Smith	6 ft 10 in (2.08 m)	210 lb (95 kg)	RS Fr	Brooklyn, NY
F	15	Cliff Thomas Jr.	6 ft 8 in (2.03 m)	235 lb (107 kg)	Jr	Montgomery, Alabama
F	22	Rob Peterson III	6 ft 4 in (1.93 m)	182 lb (83 kg)	Fr	Waxhaw, North Carolina
G/F	25	Ricky Madison	6 ft 7 in (2.01 m)	214 lb (97 kg)	Sr	Norcross, Georgia
G	32	John-Michael Hughes	6 ft 1 in (1.85 m)	164 lb (74 kg)	Fr	Ligonier, Pennsylvania
C	33	Sam Berlin	6 ft 10 in (2.08 m)	256 lb (116 kg)	RS Sr	Manassas, Virginia
F	34	Jordan Whitehead	6 ft 5 in (1.96 m)	235 lb (107 kg)	RS Sr	Morris Plains, New Jersey
F	35	Caden Sanchez	6 ft 8 in (2.03 m)	255 lb (116 kg)	RS Fr	Columbus, Ohio
G	45	Dexter Gooding	6 ft 4 in (1.93 m)	180 lb (82 kg)	Jr	Daytona Beach, Florida

Head coach

- Tubby Smith (High Point)

Assistant coach(es)

- G. G. Smith (Georgia)
- Eric Gabriel (West Liberty)
- Keith Gatlin (Maryland)

Legend

- (C) Team captain
- (S) Suspended
- (I) Ineligible
- (W) Walk-on
- Injured
- Current redshirt

Roster
Last update: October 25, 2018

== Schedule and results ==
Date time, TV	Rank^{#}	Opponent^{#}	Result	Record	Site (attendance) city, state
Exhibition
Oct 30, 2018*; 7:00 pm		Guilford	W 81–45		Millis Center (1,434); High Point, NC
Non-conference regular season
Nov 7, 2018*; 7:00 pm		at William & Mary	L 69–79	0–1	Kaplan Arena (3,301); Williamsburg, VA
Nov 10, 2018*; 2:00 pm, ESPN+		Wofford	L 60–68	0–2	Millis Center (1,342); High Point, NC
Nov 16, 2018*; 6:00 pm		vs. South Dakota; Bimini Jam semifinals	W 60–56	1–2	Gateway Christian Academy (565); Bimini, Bahamas
Nov 17, 2018*; 8:30pm		vs. UMBC; Bimini Jam	L 59–68	1–3	Gateway Christian Academy (571); Bimini, Bahamas
Nov 19, 2018*; 6:00pm		vs. Air Force; Bimini Jam	W 69–62	2–3	Gateway Christian Academy (561); Bimini, Bahamas
Nov 24, 2018*; 5:00 pm, ESPN3		at East Carolina	W 55–52	3–3	Williams Arena at Minges Coliseum (3,156); Greenville, NC
Nov 27, 2018*; 7:00 pm, ESPN+		at The Citadel	L 87–112	3–4	McAlister Field House (556); Charleston, SC
Dec 1, 2018*; 2:00 pm, ESPN+		Eastern Kentucky	L 69–70	3–5	Millis Center (1,492); High Point, NC
Dec 4, 2018*; 8:00 pm, ESPN3		at Valparaiso	W 55–53	4–5	Athletics–Recreation Center (2,479); Valparaiso, IN
Dec 15, 2018*; 7:00 pm, ESPN+		Western Carolina	W 86–59	5–5	Millis Center (1,211); High Point, NC
Dec 17, 2018*; 7:00 pm, ESPN+		North Carolina Wesleyan	W 90–85 ^{OT}	6–5	Millis Center (771); High Point, NC
Dec 22, 2018*; 3:00 pm		vs. Richmond	L 59–74	6–6	St. Elizabeths East Entertainment and Sports Arena (1,012); Washington, D.C.
Dec 29, 2018*; 12:00 pm, BTN		at No. 13 Ohio State	L 64–82	6–7	Value City Arena (14,264); Columbus, OH
Jan 2, 2019*; 7:00 pm, ESPN+		Washington College	W 101–60	7–7	Millis Center (751); High Point, NC
Big South regular season
Jan 5, 2019; 5:30 pm, ESPN+		at Charleston Southern	W 51–50	8–7 (1–0)	CSU Field House (675); North Charleston, SC
Jan 10, 2019; 7:00 pm, ESPN+		Presbyterian	W 74–58	9–7 (2–0)	Millis Center (1,287); High Point, NC
Jan 12, 2019; 2:00 pm, ESPN3		at Winthrop	W 80–63	9–8 (2–1)	Winthrop Coliseum (2,117); Rock Hill, SC
Jan 16, 2019; 7:00 pm, ESPN+		USC Upstate	W 71–54	10–8 (3–1)	Millis Center (1,486); High Point, NC
Jan 24, 2019; 7:00 pm, ESPN+		at Longwood	L 51–55	10–9 (3–2)	Willett Hall (1,481); Farmville, VA
Jan 26, 2019; 7:00 pm, ESPN+		UNC Asheville	W 65–61	11–9 (4–2)	Millis Center (1,708); High Point, NC
Jan 30, 2019; 7:00 pm, ESPN+		at Gardner–Webb	L 67–69	11–10 (4–3)	Paul Porter Arena (985); Boiling Springs, NC
Feb 2, 2019; 7:00 pm, ESPN3		Hampton	W 85–69	12–10 (5–3)	Millis Center (1,705); High Point, NC
Feb 7, 2019; 7:00 pm, ESPN+		Campbell	W 57–56	13–10 (6–3)	Millis Center (1,511); High Point, NC
Feb 9, 2019; 7:00 pm, ESPN+		at Radford	L 66–67 ^{OT}	13–11 (6–4)	Dedmon Center (1,610); Radford, VA
Feb 13, 2019; 7:00 pm, ESPN+		Longwood	L 59–62	13–12 (6–5)	Millis Center (1,122); High Point, NC
Feb 16, 2019; 6:00 pm, ESPN+		at Hampton	W 86–81 ^{OT}	14–12 (7–5)	Hampton Convocation Center (4,125); Hampton, VA
Feb 21, 2019; 7:00 pm, ESPN+		at Campbell	L 48–61	14–13 (7–6)	Gore Arena (2,952); Buies Creek, NC
Feb 23, 2019; 7:00 pm, ESPN+		Gardner–Webb	W 87–79	15–13 (8–6)	Millis Center (1,202); High Point, NC
Feb 27, 2019; 7:00 pm, ESPN+		Radford	L 54–72	15–14 (8–7)	Millis Center (1,241); High Point, NC
Mar 2, 2019; 4:30 pm, ESPN+		at UNC Asheville	W 79–74	16–14 (9–7)	Kimmel Arena (2,376); Asheville, NC
Big South tournament
Mar 7, 2019; 8:00 pm, ESPN3	(5)	vs. (4) Gardner–Webb; Quarterfinals	L 69–75	16–15	Gore Arena (2,948); Buies Creek, NC
*Non-conference game. (#) Tournament seedings in parentheses. All times are in Eastern Time Source.
