= 2018–19 Winthrop Eagles men's basketball team =

American college basketball season

2018–19 Winthrop Eagles men's basketball
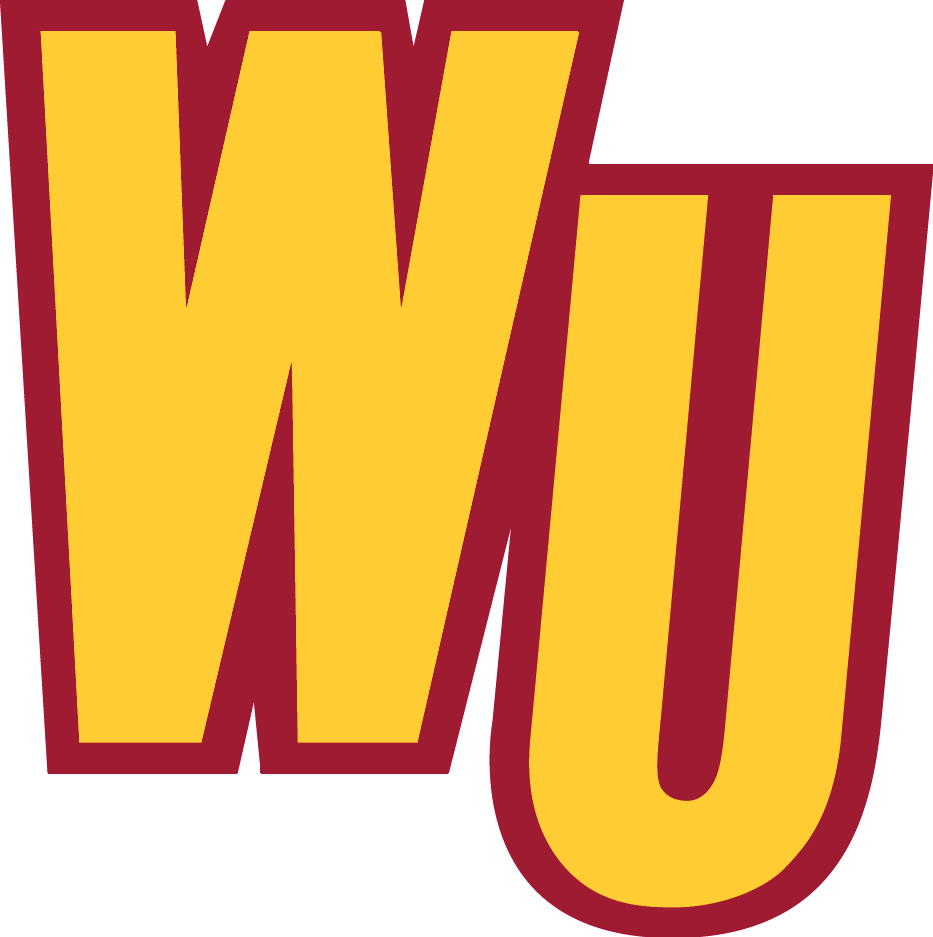
- Conference: Big South Conference
- Record: 18–12 (10–6 Big South)
- Head coach: Pat Kelsey (7th season)
- Assistant coaches: Jayson Gee; Brian Kloman; Mike Howland
- Home arena: Winthrop Coliseum

2018–19 Big South men's basketball standings
	Conf.				Overall
Team	W		L	PCT	W		L	PCT
Campbell	12	–	4	.750	20	–	13	.606
Radford	12	–	4	.750	22	–	11	.667
Winthrop	10	–	6	.625	18	–	12	.600
Gardner–Webb †	10	–	6	.625	23	–	12	.657
High Point	9	–	7	.563	16	–	15	.516
Charleston Southern	9	–	7	.563	18	–	16	.529
Presbyterian	9	–	7	.563	20	–	16	.556
Hampton	9	–	7	.563	18	–	17	.514
Longwood	5	–	11	.313	16	–	18	.471
UNC Asheville	2	–	14	.125	4	–	27	.129
USC Upstate	1	–	15	.063	6	–	26	.188
† 2019 Big South tournament winner

The 2018–19 Winthrop Eagles men's basketball team represented Winthrop University during the 2018–19 NCAA Division I men's basketball season. The Eagles, led by seventh-year head coach Pat Kelsey, played their home games at the Winthrop Coliseum in Rock Hill, South Carolina as members of the Big South Conference. They lost in the quarterfinals of the Big South tournament to Charleston Southern.

== Previous season ==
The Eagles finished the 2017–18 season 19–12, 12–6 in Big South play to finish in a tie for second place. They defeated Gardner–Webb in the quarterfinals of the Big South tournament before losing in the semifinals to Radford.

== Roster ==
2018–19 Winthrop Eagles men's basketball team
Players
Coaches

Pos.	#	Name	Height	Weight	Year	Hometown
G	0	Nych Smith	5 ft 10 in (1.78 m)	180 lb (82 kg)	RS Sr	Memphis, Tennessee
G	1	Keondre Shumacher	6 ft 0 in (1.83 m)	175 lb (79 kg)	RS Fr	Normal, Illinois
C	2	Tom Pupavac	6 ft 10 in (2.08 m)	220 lb (100 kg)	RS So	Geelong, Australia
G	3	Micheal Anumba	6 ft 5 in (1.96 m)	—	Fr	Reggio Amelia, Italy
G	11	Charles Falden	6 ft 3 in (1.91 m)	190 lb (86 kg)	So	Richmond, Virginia
G	13	Bjorn Broman	6 ft 0 in (1.83 m)	177 lb (80 kg)	Sr	Duluth, Minnesota
G	14	Adam Pickett	6 ft 1 in (1.85 m)	195 lb (88 kg)	Sr	Staunton, Virginia
G	15	Jermaine Ukaegbu	6 ft 2 in (1.88 m)	200 lb (91 kg)	Sr	Silver Spring, Maryland
G	21	Kyle Zunic	6 ft 2 in (1.88 m)	177 lb (80 kg)	So	Wollongong, Australia
F	22	Austin Awad	6 ft 6 in (1.98 m)	200 lb (91 kg)	Sr	Melbourne, Florida
F	25	Josh Ferguson	6 ft 8 in (2.03 m)	200 lb (91 kg)	Jr	Miami, Florida
F	30	Raivis Scerbinskis	6 ft 8 in (2.03 m)	215 lb (98 kg)	RS So	Riga, Latvia
F	52	Chandler Vaudrin	6 ft 7 in (2.01 m)	—	Jr	Uniontown, Ohio

Head coach

- Pat Kelsey (Xavier)

Assistant coach(es)

- Jayson Gee (Charleston)
- Brian Kloman (Tennessee)
- Mike Howland (DePauw)

Legend

- (C) Team captain
- (S) Suspended
- (I) Ineligible
- (W) Walk-on
- Injured
- Current redshirt

Roster
Last update: October 30, 2018

== Schedule and results ==
Date time, TV	Rank^{#}	Opponent^{#}	Result	Record	Site (attendance) city, state
Non-conference regular season
Nov 6, 2018*; 9:30 pm, SECN+		at Vanderbilt	L 79–92	0–1	Memorial Gymnasium (8,387); Nashville, TN
Nov 10, 2018*; 8:00 pm, ESPN+		at SIU Edwardsville	W 94–82	1–1	Vadalabene Center (1,358); Edwardsville, IL
Nov 13, 2018*; 7:00 pm, ESPN+		Pfeiffer; Ohio Valley Hardwood Showcase	W 134–99	2–1	Winthrop Coliseum (1,179); Rock Hill, SC
Nov 17, 2018*; 2:30 pm, ESPN+		East Tennessee State; Ohio Valley Hardwood Showcase	L 74–76	2–2	Winthrop Coliseum (2,117); Rock Hill, SC
Nov 21, 2018*; 1:00 pm, SECN		at No. 10 Kentucky; Ohio Valley Hardwood Showcase	L 74–87	2–3	Rupp Arena (20,070); Lexington, KY
Nov 24, 2018*; 2:00 pm, ESPN+		Warren Wilson; Ohio Valley Hardwood Showcase	W 116–76	3–3	Winthrop Coliseum (642); Rock Hill, SC
Nov 28, 2018*; 7:00 pm, ESPN+		at Tennessee Tech	W 82–70	4–3	Eblen Center (980); Cookeville, TN
Dec 4, 2018*; 7:00 pm, ESPN+		at Davidson	L 81–99	4–4	John M. Belk Arena (3,191); Davidson, NC
Dec 16, 2018*; 2:00 pm, ESPN+		Hiwassee	W 109–66	5–4	Winthrop Coliseum (642); Rock Hill, SC
Dec 20, 2018*; 11:00 am, ESPN+		Maryland Eastern Shore	W 88–74	6–4	Winthrop Coliseum (4,127); Rock Hill, SC
Dec 22, 2018*; 4:00 pm, ESPN+		at Southern Illinois	W 79–71	7–4	SIU Arena (5,009); Carbondale, IL
Dec 29, 2018*; 12:00 pm, ESPN+		Prairie View A&M	W 76–62	8–4	Winthrop Coliseum (411); Rock Hill, SC
Jan 1, 2019*; 2:00 pm, ACCN Extra		at No. 9 Florida State	L 76–87	8–5	Donald L. Tucker Civic Center (7,237); Tallahassee, FL
Big South regular season
Jan 5, 2019; 2:00 pm, ESPN+		at UNC Asheville	W 80–65	9–5 (1–0)	Kimmel Arena (1,847); Asheville, NC
Jan 10, 2019; 7:00 pm, ESPNU		at Campbell	W 90–86	10–5 (2–0)	Gore Arena (2,704); Buies Creek, NC
Jan 12, 2019; 2:00 pm, ESPN+		High Point	W 80–63	11–5 (3–0)	Winthrop Coliseum (2,117); Rock Hill, SC
Jan 16, 2019; 7:00 pm, ESPN+		Longwood	L 61–75	11–6 (3–1)	Winthrop Coliseum (1,916); Rock Hill, SC
Jan 19, 2019; 4:30 pm, ESPN+		at USC Upstate	W 82–72	12–6 (4–1)	G. B. Hodge Center (767); Spartanburg, SC
Jan 21, 2019; 2:00 pm, ESPN+		UNC Asheville	W 66–45	13–6 (5–1)	Winthrop Coliseum (1,674); Rock Hill, SC
Jan 24, 2019; 7:00 pm, ESPNU		Gardner–Webb	W 97–88	14–6 (6–1)	Winthrop Coliseum (2,864); Rock Hill, SC
Jan 26, 2019; 4:00 pm, ESPN+		at Presbyterian	L 91–99	14–7 (6–2)	Templeton Physical Education Center (905); Clinton, SC
Feb 2, 2019; 2:00 pm, ESPN+		Radford	L 61–80	14–8 (6–3)	Winthrop Coliseum (2,681); Rock Hill, SC
Feb 7, 2019; 7:30 pm, ESPN+		at Charleston Southern	W 76–72	15–8 (7–3)	CSU Field House (733); North Charleston, SC
Feb 9, 2019; 2:00 pm, ESPN+		Hampton	W 101–91	16–8 (8–3)	Winthrop Coliseum (1,466); Rock Hill, SC
Feb 13, 2019; 7:00 pm, ESPN+		Presbyterian	W 93–85	17–8 (9–3)	Winthrop Coliseum (1,202); Rock Hill, SC
Feb 16, 2019; 5:00 pm, ESPN+		at Gardner–Webb	L 60–64	17–9 (9–4)	Paul Porter Arena (2,049); Boiling Springs, NC
Feb 21, 2019; 7:00 pm, ESPN+		at Radford	L 81–87	17–10 (9–5)	Dedmon Center (2,702); Radford, VA
Feb 23, 2019; 2:00 pm, ESPN3		Charleston Southern	W 80–78 ^{2OT}	18–10 (10–5)	Winthrop Coliseum (3,755); Rock Hill, SC
Feb 28, 2019; 7:00 pm, ESPNews		at Hampton	L 75–90	18–11 (10–6)	Hampton Convocation Center (4,712); Hampton, VA
Big South tournament
Mar 7, 2019; 2:00 pm, ESPN3	(3)	vs. (6) Charleston Southern; Quarterfinals	L 63–77	18–12	Gore Arena (1,460); Buies Creek, NC
*Non-conference game. ^{#}Rankings from AP Poll. (#) Tournament seedings in parentheses. All times are in Eastern Time.
