= 2018–19 Longwood Lancers men's basketball team =

American college basketball season

2018–19 Longwood Lancers men's basketball

CBI, Quarterfinals
- Conference: Big South Conference
- Record: 16–18 (5–11 Big South)
- Head coach: Griff Aldrich (1st season)
- Assistant coaches: Cody Anderson (4th season); Brian Graves (1st season); Marty McGillan (1st season); Maurice Williams (1st season)
- Home arena: Willett Hall

2018–19 Big South men's basketball standings
	Conf.				Overall
Team	W		L	PCT	W		L	PCT
Campbell	12	–	4	.750	20	–	13	.606
Radford	12	–	4	.750	22	–	11	.667
Winthrop	10	–	6	.625	18	–	12	.600
Gardner–Webb †	10	–	6	.625	23	–	12	.657
High Point	9	–	7	.563	16	–	15	.516
Charleston Southern	9	–	7	.563	18	–	16	.529
Presbyterian	9	–	7	.563	20	–	16	.556
Hampton	9	–	7	.563	18	–	17	.514
Longwood	5	–	11	.313	16	–	18	.471
UNC Asheville	2	–	14	.125	4	–	27	.129
USC Upstate	1	–	15	.063	6	–	26	.188
† 2019 Big South tournament winner

The 2018–19 Longwood Lancers men's basketball team represented Longwood University during the 2018–19 NCAA Division I men's basketball season. They were led by head coach Griff Aldrich, in his first season, and played their home games at Willett Hall in Farmville, Virginia as members of the Big South Conference. They finished the season 16–18, 5–11 in Big South play to finish in ninth place. They lost in the first round of the Big South tournament to Hampton. They were invited to the College Basketball Invitational, their first ever Division I postseason tournament, where they defeated Southern Miss in the first round before losing in the quarterfinals to DePaul.

== Previous season ==
The 2017–18 Lancers finished the season 7–26, 3–15 in Big South play to finish in last place. They defeated High Point in the first round of the Big South tournament to advance to the quarterfinals where they lost to Radford.

On March 2, 2018, head coach Jayson Gee was fired. He finished at Longwood with a five-year record of 42–120. On March 22, the school hired UMBC assistant Griff Aldrich as head coach.

== Roster ==
2018–19 Longwood Lancers men's basketball team
Players
Coaches

Pos.	#	Name	Height	Weight	Year	Hometown
G	2	Kamil Chapman	6 ft 1 in (1.85 m)	185 lb (84 kg)	So	Charlotte, North Carolina
G	3	Shabooty Phillips	6 ft 1 in (1.85 m)	185 lb (84 kg)	Jr	Houston, Texas
G	4	Jaylon Wilson	6 ft 3 in (1.91 m)	180 lb (82 kg)	Jr	Moore, Oklahoma
F	5	Pernell Adgei	6 ft 8 in (2.03 m)	220 lb (100 kg)	RS Jr	Dumfries, Virginia
G	10	Michael Smith	6 ft 2 in (1.88 m)	190 lb (86 kg)	Fr	Pleasanton, California
G	11	Seán Flood	6 ft 2 in (1.88 m)	170 lb (77 kg)	RS Jr	Dublin, Ireland
F	12	Joey Lipp	6 ft 6 in (1.98 m)	190 lb (86 kg)	Fr	Woodland Hills, California
F	13	Spencer Franklin	6 ft 8 in (2.03 m)	210 lb (95 kg)	RS Sr	Fort Worth, Texas
F	14	Abraham Deng	6 ft 11 in (2.11 m)	215 lb (98 kg)	Fr	Juba, South Sudan
F	20	Jordan Cintron	6 ft 8 in (2.03 m)	205 lb (93 kg)	So	Bronx, New York
F	21	JaShaun Smith	6 ft 5 in (1.96 m)	195 lb (88 kg)	Jr	Garner, North Carolina
F	23	Gus Okafor	6 ft 6 in (1.98 m)	220 lb (100 kg)	Fr	Baltimore, Maryland
F	24	Damarion Geter (C)	6 ft 8 in (2.03 m)	230 lb (104 kg)	RS Sr	Dayton, Ohio
G	55	Juan Munoz	5 ft 11 in (1.8 m)	165 lb (75 kg)	RS So	Morrisville, North Carolina

Head coach

- Griff Aldrich (Hampden–Sydney)

Assistant coach(es)

- Cody Anderson (Georgia)
- Brian Graves (Catawba)
- Marty McGillan (UNC Wilmington)
- Maurice Williams (Frostburg State)

Legend

- (C) Team captain
- (S) Suspended
- (I) Ineligible
- (W) Walk-on
- Injured
- Current redshirt

Roster
Last update: October 25, 2018

== Schedule and results ==
Date time, TV	Rank^{#}	Opponent^{#}	Result	Record	High points	High rebounds	High assists	Site (attendance) city, state
Non-conference regular season
Nov 6, 2018*; 7:00 pm, ESPN+		Randolph	W 84–56	1–0	20 – Walton	10 – Cintron	5 – Phillips	Willett Hall (1,314); Farmville, VA
Nov 9, 2018*; 7:00 pm, ESPN+		at Richmond	W 63–58	2–0	23 – Walton	12 – Walton	4 – Walton	Robins Center (6,717); Richmond, VA
Nov 13, 2018*; 7:00 pm		at Maryland Eastern Shore	W 66–63	3–0	20 – Walton	7 – Walton	4 – Phillips	Hytche Athletic Center (1,115); Princess Anne, MD
Nov 16, 2018*; 7:00 pm, ESPN+		Delaware State	W 89–73	4–0	21 – Walton	7 – Phillips	7 – Phillips	Willett Hall (1,798); Farmville, VA
Nov 19, 2018*; 7:00 pm, ESPN+		at Charlotte	L 39–42	4–1	12 – Walton	10 – Walton	2 – Walton	Halton Arena (3,740); Charlotte, NC
Nov 23, 2018*; 6:00 pm		vs. Fairfield; Elgin Baylor Classic	W 67–65	5–1	19 – Flood	7 – Tied	4 – Phillips	Redhawk Center (618); Seattle, WA
Nov 24, 2018*; 3:00 pm		vs. Denver; Elgin Baylor Classic	W 64–62	5–2	15 – J. Smith	6 – Geter	3 – Cintron	Redhawk Center (809); Seattle, WA
Nov 25, 2018*; 6:00 pm		at Seattle; Elgin Baylor Classic	L 50–70	5–3	22 – Phillips	6 – Tied	2 – Tied	Redhawk Center (753); Seattle, WA
Dec 1, 2018*; 3:00 pm, ESPN+		VMI	W 65–45	6–3	23 – Phillips	11 – Phillips	5 – Flood	Willett Hall (1,428); Farmville, VA
Dec 7, 2018*; 7:00 pm, ESPN+		Frostburg State	W 68–65 ^{OT}	7–3	13 – Tied	13 – Geter	3 – Phillips	Willett Hall (874); Farmville, VA
Dec 9, 2018*; 1:00 pm, ESPN+		at Duquesne	L 71–80	7–4	20 – J. Smith	9 – Geter	7 – Phillips	Palumbo Center (1,565); Pittsburgh, PA
Dec 13, 2018*; 7:00 pm, ESPN+		Averett	W 81–57	8–4	23 – Phillips	10 – Geter	6 – Phillips	Willett Hall (432); Farmville, VA
Dec 17, 2018*; 7:00 pm, ESPN+		at Cornell	L 64–70	8–5	18 – Phillips	11 – Phillips	2 – Wilson	Newman Arena (686); Ithaca, NY
Dec 21, 2018*; 7:00 pm, ESPN+		Stetson	W 77–63	9–5	21 – Flood	6 – Geter	6 – Phillips	Willett Hall (602); Farmville, VA
Dec 29, 2018*; 1:00 pm, ESPN3		at The Citadel	W 110–94	10–5	29 – Walton	11 – Phillips	8 – Phillips	McAlister Field House (964); Charleston, SC
Big South regular season
Jan 5, 2019; 4:30 pm, ESPN+		at Radford	L 64–71	10–6 (0–1)	14 – Walton	13 – Walton	3 – Walton	Dedmon Center (1,411); Radford, VA
Jan 10, 2019; 7:00 pm, ESPN+		UNC Asheville	W 67–62	11–6 (1–1)	14 – Phillips	8 – Walton	3 – Tied	Willett Hall (1,024); Farmville, VA
Jan 12, 2019; 3:00 pm, ESPN+		Charleston Southern	W 101-91	11-7 (1–2)	21 – Walton	6 – Phillips	6 – Walton	Willett Hall (1,084); Farmville, VA
Jan 16, 2019; 7:00 pm, ESPN+		at Winthrop	W 75–61	12–7 (2–2)	30 – Walton	10 – Geter	3 – Tied	Winthrop Coliseum (1,916); Rock Hill, SC
Jan 19, 2019; 4:00 pm, ESPN+		at Presbyterian	L 64–71	12–8 (2–3)	18 – Phillips	7 – Tied	5 – Phillips	Templeton Center (535); Clinton, SC
Jan 21, 2019; 7:00 pm, ESPN+		Radford	L 59–72	12–9 (2–4)	26 – Walton	6 – Walton	2 – Tied	Willett Hall (1,642); Farmville, VA
Jan 24, 2019; 7:00 pm, ESPN+		High Point	W 55–51	13–9 (3–4)	11 – Walton	10 – Franklin	2 – Tied	Willett Hall (1,481); Farmville, VA
Jan 26, 2019; 4:30 pm, ESPN+		at USC Upstate	L 63–80	13–10 (3–5)	12 – Tied	6 – Okafor	2 – Phillips	G. B. Hodge Center (564); Spartanburg, SC
Jan 30, 2019; 7:00 pm, ESPN+		Hampton	L 83–96	13–11 (3–6)	25 – Phillips	7 – Smith	5 – Phillips	Willett Hall (1,108); Farmville, VA
Feb 2, 2019; 2:00 pm, ESPN+		at Campbell	L 62–83	13–12 (3–7)	14 – Tied	6 – Franklin	2 – 3 Tied	Gore Arena (2,619); Buies Creek, NC
Feb 7, 2019; 7:00 pm, ESPN+		Gardner–Webb	L 88–89 ^{OT}	13–13 (3–8)	19 – Wilson	10 – Cintron	5 – Phillips	Willett Hall (1,472); Farmville, VA
Feb 13, 2019; 7:00 pm, ESPN+		at High Point	W 62–59	14–13 (4–8)	17 – Phillips	8 – Wilson	6 – Phillips	Millis Athletic Convocation Center (1,122); High Point, NC
Feb 16, 2019; 3:00 pm, ESPN+		USC Upstate	W 83–79	15–13 (5–8)	19 – J. Smith	7 – Phillips	4 – Phillips	Willett Hall (1,378); Farmville, VA
Feb 21, 2019; 7:00 pm, ESPN+		at Hampton	L 66–86	15–14 (5–9)	27 – Wilson	5 – Phillips	5 – Phillips	Hampton Convocation Center (4,512); Hampton, VA
Feb 23, 2019; 3:00 pm, ESPN+		Campbell	L 72–74	15–15 (5–10)	19 – Phillips	7 – Cintron	5 – Phillips	Willett Hall (1,482); Farmville, VA
Mar 2, 2019; 7:00 pm, ESPN+		at Gardner–Webb	L 47-66	15–16 (5–11)	16 – Wilson	6 – Phillips	2 – Wilson	Paul Porter Arena (1,590); Boiling Springs, NC
Big South Conference tournament
Mar 5, 2019; 7:00 pm, ESPN3	(9)	at (8) Hampton; First round	L 71–77	15–17	23 – Wilson	6 – Cintron	3 – Munoz	Hampton Convocation Center (3,500); Hampton, VA
College Basketball Invitational
Mar 20, 2019*; 7:00 pm, ESPN+		Southern Miss; First round	W 90–68	16–17	23 – Wilson	8 – Wilson	7 – Phillips	Willett Hall (1,372); Farmville, VA
Mar 25, 2019*; 7:00 pm, NBCSN Chicago+		at DePaul; Quarterfinals	L 89–97	16–18	18 – Phillips	6 – Tied	4 – Geter	McGrath–Phillips Arena (1,040); Chicago, IL
*Non-conference game. ^{#}Rankings from AP Poll. (#) Tournament seedings in parentheses. All times are in Eastern Time..
