= 2018–19 Hampton Pirates basketball team =

American college basketball season

2018–19 Hampton Pirates men's basketball
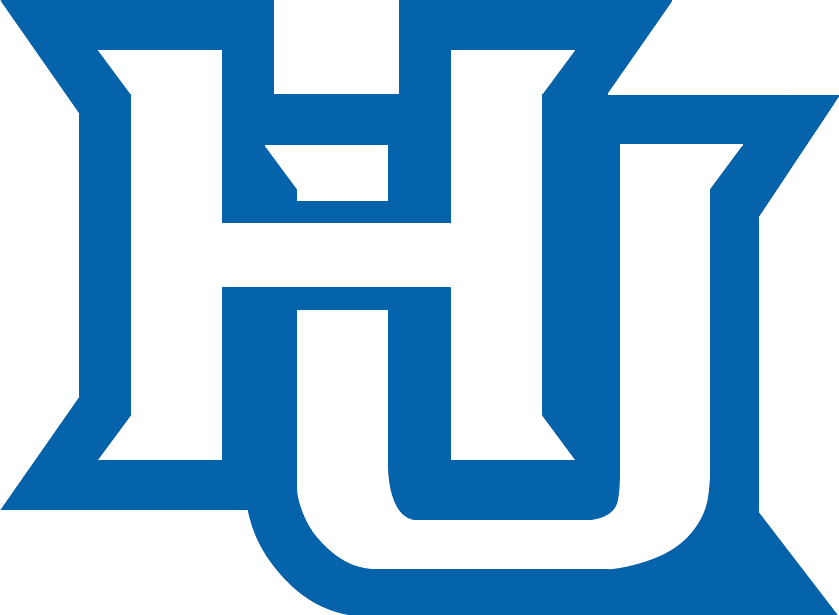

Coach John McLendon Classic champions

CIT, Semifinals
- Conference: Big South Conference
- Record: 18–17 (9–7 Big South)
- Head coach: Edward Joyner (10th season)
- Assistant coaches: Darryl Sharp; Matthew Hamilton; Jamal Robinson
- Home arena: Hampton Convocation Center

2018–19 Big South men's basketball standings
	Conf.				Overall
Team	W		L	PCT	W		L	PCT
Campbell	12	–	4	.750	20	–	13	.606
Radford	12	–	4	.750	22	–	11	.667
Winthrop	10	–	6	.625	18	–	12	.600
Gardner–Webb †	10	–	6	.625	23	–	12	.657
High Point	9	–	7	.563	16	–	15	.516
Charleston Southern	9	–	7	.563	18	–	16	.529
Presbyterian	9	–	7	.563	20	–	16	.556
Hampton	9	–	7	.563	18	–	17	.514
Longwood	5	–	11	.313	16	–	18	.471
UNC Asheville	2	–	14	.125	4	–	27	.129
USC Upstate	1	–	15	.063	6	–	26	.188
† 2019 Big South tournament winner

The 2018–19 Hampton Pirates men's basketball team represented Hampton University during the 2018–19 NCAA Division I men's basketball season. The Pirates, led by tenth-year head coach Edward Joyner, played their home games at the Hampton Convocation Center in Hampton, Virginia as first-year members of the Big South Conference. They finished the season 18–17, 9–7 in Big South play to finish in a four-way tie for fifth place. They defeated Longwood in the first round of the Big South tournament before losing in the quarterfinals to Campbell. They were invited to the CollegeInsider.com Tournament where they defeated St. Francis Brooklyn in the first round to win the Coach John McLendon Classic, fellow Big South member Charleston Southern in the second round, and NJIT in the quarterfinals before losing in the semifinals to Marshall.

== Previous season ==
They finished the season 19–16, 12–4 in MEAC play to finish in a three-way tie for the MEAC Regular season championship. After tiebreakers, they received the No. 1 seed in the MEAC tournament where they Florida A&M and North Carolina A&T to advance to the championship game where they lost to North Carolina Central. As a regular season conference champion, and No. 1 seed in their conference tournament, who failed to win their conference tournament, they received an automatic bid to the National Invitation Tournament where they lost in the first round to Notre Dame.

The season was the Pirates' final season as members of the MEAC, as the school announced on November 16, 2017, that they will join the Big South Conference for the 2018–19 season.

== Roster ==
2018–19 Hampton Pirates men's basketball team
Players
Coaches

Pos.	#	Name	Height	Weight	Year	Previous school	Hometown
F	0	Ricquall Smoot	6 ft 8 in (2.03 m)	250 lb (113 kg)	Jr	The Potters House Christian Academy; Howard College	Augusta, GA
G	1	Lysander Bracey	6 ft 4 in (1.93 m)	170 lb (77 kg)	Sr	Northside Christian Academy; Brunswick Community College	Charlotte, NC
G	2	Jermaine Marrow	6 ft 0 in (1.83 m)	182 lb (83 kg)	Jr	Heritage HS	Newport News, VA
G/F	3	Trey Carver	6 ft 5 in (1.96 m)	230 lb (104 kg)	Jr	Northeastern HS	Elizabeth City, NC
G	4	Greg Heckstall	6 ft 6 in (1.98 m)	195 lb (88 kg)	Jr	Norview HS; Bryant & Stratton College	Norfolk, VA
C	5	Pierre Sow	7 ft 0 in (2.13 m)	215 lb (98 kg)	RS Fr	Teaneck HS	Teaneck, NJ
G	11	Dondre Griffin	6 ft 3 in (1.91 m)	200 lb (91 kg)	Jr	Knightdale HS; Murray State; Navarro College	Raleigh, NC
C	13	James Dunlop	6 ft 11 in (2.11 m)	230 lb (104 kg)	Fr	Hargrave Military Academy	Centreville, VA
F	14	Ben Stanley	6 ft 6 in (1.98 m)	225 lb (102 kg)	RS Fr	Millwood HS	Baltimore, MD
G	15	JJ Watson	6 ft 2 in (1.88 m)	170 lb (77 kg)	Fr	St. John Bosco HS	Long Beach, CA
G	20	Jerry Carter	6 ft 3 in (1.91 m)	200 lb (91 kg)	RS So	Mount Olive	Woodbridge, VA
G	21	Devon Oakley	6 ft 3 in (1.91 m)	185 lb (84 kg)	Sr	Nansemond River HS	Chesapeake, VA
F	22	Trevond Barnes	6 ft 9 in (2.06 m)	210 lb (95 kg)	Sr	Lafayette HS	Lafayette, AL
G	23	Kalin Fisher	6 ft 2 in (1.88 m)	180 lb (82 kg)	Sr	Proviso East HS	Chicago, IL
F	24	Austin Colbert	6 ft 9 in (2.06 m)	202 lb (92 kg)	RS Sr	Old Dominion; Illinois	Chesapeake, VA
G	25	Akim Mitchell	6 ft 5 in (1.96 m)	205 lb (93 kg)	Sr	Carlisle HS	Charlotte, NC
G	45	Eugene Marshall III	6 ft 3 in (1.91 m)	170 lb (77 kg)	RS Sr	Hackensack HS	Hackensack, NJ

Head coach

- Edward Joyner, JR (Hampton)

Assistant coach(es)

- Darryl Sharp (Bloomsburg)
- Matthew Hamilton (Appalachian State)
- Jamal Robinson (Virginia)

Legend

- (C) Team captain
- (S) Suspended
- (I) Ineligible
- (W) Walk-on
- Injured
- Current redshirt

Roster
Last update: Oct. 17, 2018

== Accolades ==
=== Athlon Sports All Big South Second Team ===
- Jermaine Marrow

=== Lindy's Sports All Conference Second Team ===
- Jermaine Marrow

== Schedule and results ==
Date time, TV	Rank^{#}	Opponent^{#}	Result	Record	Site (attendance) city, state
Non-conference regular season
Nov 6, 2018*; 7:00 pm, ESPN+		Mid-Atlantic Christian	W 110–58	1–0	Hampton Convocation Center (3,712); Hampton, VA
Nov 9, 2018*; 7:00 pm, MASN		at VCU; Legends Classic	L 57–69	1–1	Siegel Center (7,637); Richmond, VA
Nov 13, 2018*; 10:00 pm, P12N		at California; Legends Classic	L 66–80	1–2	Haas Pavilion (3,312); Berkeley, CA
Nov 19, 2018*; 5:00 pm		vs. Bowling Green; Legends Classic	L 79–81	1–3	Calihan Hall (1,343); Detroit, MI
Nov 20, 2018*; 5:00 pm		vs. Loyola (MD); Legends Classic	L 66–75	1–4	Calihan Hall (1,367); Detroit, MI
Nov 25, 2018*; 6:00 pm, ESPN+		at Richmond	W 86–66	2–4	Robins Center (4,475); Richmond, VA
Nov 29, 2018*; 7:00 pm		at Norfolk State	L 89–94 ^{2OT}	2–5	Joseph G. Echols Memorial Hall (4,500); Norfolk, VA
Dec 1, 2018*; 4:00 pm, ESPN+		Regent	W 114–55	3–5	Hampton Convocation Center (3,321); Hampton, VA
Dec 5, 2018*; 7:30 pm		at Coastal Carolina	L 66–75	3–6	HTC Center (1,133); Conway, SC
Dec 8, 2018*; 4:00 pm, ESPN+		William & Mary	L 71–76	3–7	Hampton Convocation Center (3,543); Hampton, VA
Dec 15, 2018*; 6:00 pm, ESPN+		Saint Leo	W 72–60	4–7	Hampton Convocation Center (3,612); Hampton, VA
Dec 22, 2018*; 5:00 pm		vs. Howard; DC Holiday HoopsFest	W 89–82	5–7	St. Elizabeths East Entertainment and Sports Arena (1,050); Washington, D.C.
Dec 20, 2018*; 1:00 pm		at Saint Peter's	W 83–80 ^{OT}	5–8	Yanitelli Center (649); Jersey City, NJ
Big South regular season
Jan 10, 2019; 7:00 pm, ESPN+		Charleston Southern	W 94–82	6–8 (1–0)	Hampton Convocation Center (4,512); Hampton, VA
Jan 12, 2019; 4:00 pm, ESPN+		UNC Asheville	W 83–61	7–8 (2–0)	Hampton Convocation Center (3,512); Hampton, VA
Jan 16, 2019; 7:00 pm, ESPN+		at Presbyterian	L 70–85	7–9 (2–1)	Templeton Physical Education Center (340); Clinton, SC
Jan 19, 2019; 7:00 pm, ESPN+		at Gardner–Webb	L 74–87 ^{OT}	7–10 (2–2)	Paul Porter Arena (1,250); Boiling Springs, NC
Jan 24, 2019; 7:00 pm, ESPN+		USC Upstate	W 88–70	8–10 (3–2)	Hampton Convocation Center (3,123); Hampton, VA
Jan 26, 2019; 6:00 pm, ESPN+		Campbell	W 64–58	9–10 (4–2)	Hampton Convocation Center (5,412); Hampton, VA
Jan 30, 2019; 7:00 pm, ESPN+		at Longwood	W 96–83	10–10 (5–2)	Willett Hall (1,108); Farmville, VA
Feb 2, 2019; 7:00 pm, ESPN3		at High Point	L 69–85	10–11 (5–3)	Millis Athletic Convocation Center (1,705); High Point, NC
Feb 7, 2019; 7:00 pm, ESPNU		Radford	L 98–101 ^{OT}	10–12 (5–4)	Hampton Convocation Center (6,523); Hampton, VA
Feb 9, 2019; 2:00 pm, ESPN+		at Winthrop	L 91–101	10–13 (5–5)	Winthrop Coliseum (1,466); Rock Hill, SC
Feb 13, 2019; 7:00 pm, ESPN+		at Campbell	L 84–87	10–14 (5–6)	Gore Arena (1,678); Buies Creek, NC
Feb 16, 2019; 6:00 pm, ESPN+		High Point	L 81–86 ^{OT}	10–15 (5–7)	Hampton Convocation Center (4,125); Hampton, VA
Feb 21, 2019; 7:00 pm, ESPN+		Longwood	W 86–66	11–15 (6–7)	Hampton Convocation Center (4,512); Hampton, VA
Feb 23, 2019; 5:00 pm, ESPN+		at Radford	W 74–71	12–15 (7–7)	Dedmon Center (2,704); Radford, VA
Feb 28, 2019; 7:00 pm, ESPNews		Winthrop	W 90–75	13–15 (8–7)	Hampton Convocation Center (4,712); Hampton, VA
Mar 2, 2019; 4:00 pm, ESPN+		at USC Upstate	W 92–71	14–15 (9–7)	G. B. Hodge Center (717); Spartanburg, SC
Big South tournament
Mar 5, 2019; 7:00 pm, ESPN3	(8)	(9) Longwood; First round	W 77–71	15–15	Hampton Convocation Center (3,500); Hampton, VA
Mar 7, 2019; 6:00 pm, ESPN3	(8)	at (1) Campbell; Quarterfinals	L 77–86	15–16	Gore Arena (2,948); Buies Creek, NC
CollegeInsider.com Postseason tournament
Mar 21, 2019*; 7:00 pm, ESPN+		St. Francis Brooklyn; First round, Coach John McLendon Classic	W 81–72	16–16	Hampton Convocation Center (3,124); Hampton, VA
Mar 26, 2019*; 7:00 pm, watchcit.com		Charleston Southern; Second round	W 73–67	17–16	Hampton Convocation Center (3,523); Hampton, VA
Mar 28, 2019*; 8:00 pm		at NJIT; Quarterfinals	W 82–70	18–16	Wellness and Events Center (776); Newark, NJ
Apr 2, 2019*; 7:00 pm		at Marshall; Semifinals	L 78–80	18–17	Cam Henderson Center (4,122); Huntington, WV
*Non-conference game. ^{#}Rankings from AP Poll. (#) Tournament seedings in parentheses. All times are in Eastern Time.
