= 2018–19 Charleston Southern Buccaneers men's basketball team =

American college basketball season

2018–19 Charleston Southern Buccaneers men's basketball
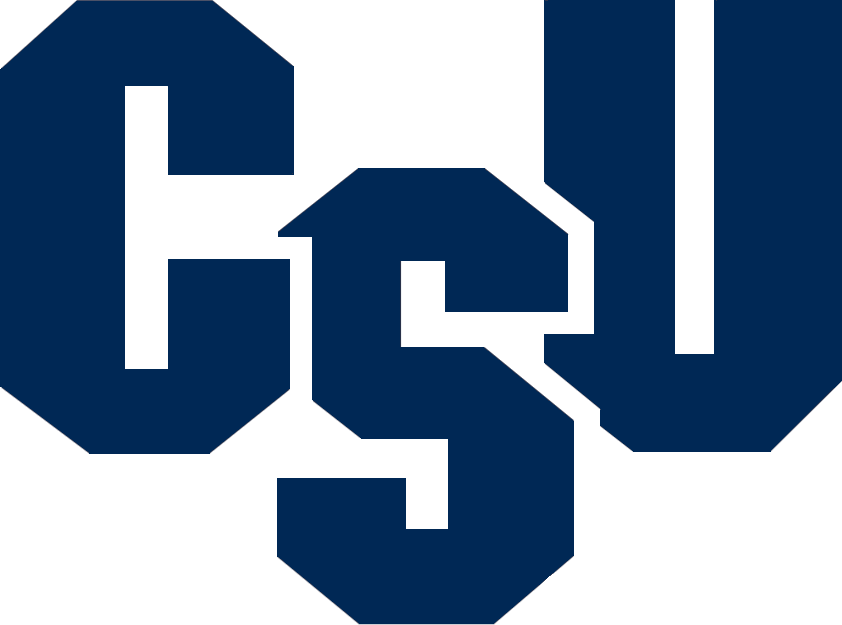

CIT, Second round
- Conference: Big South Conference
- Record: 18–16 (9–7 Big South)
- Head coach: Barclay Radebaugh (14th season)
- Assistant coaches: Rick Duckett; Thomas Butters; Arlon Harper
- Home arena: CSU Field House

2018–19 Big South men's basketball standings
	Conf.				Overall
Team	W		L	PCT	W		L	PCT
Campbell	12	–	4	.750	20	–	13	.606
Radford	12	–	4	.750	22	–	11	.667
Winthrop	10	–	6	.625	18	–	12	.600
Gardner–Webb †	10	–	6	.625	23	–	12	.657
High Point	9	–	7	.563	16	–	15	.516
Charleston Southern	9	–	7	.563	18	–	16	.529
Presbyterian	9	–	7	.563	20	–	16	.556
Hampton	9	–	7	.563	18	–	17	.514
Longwood	5	–	11	.313	16	–	18	.471
UNC Asheville	2	–	14	.125	4	–	27	.129
USC Upstate	1	–	15	.063	6	–	26	.188
† 2019 Big South tournament winner

The 2018–19 Charleston Southern Buccaneers men's basketball team represented Charleston Southern University during the 2018–19 NCAA Division I men's basketball season. The Buccaneers, led by 14th-year head coach Barclay Radebaugh, played their home games at the CSU Field House in North Charleston, South Carolina as members of the Big South Conference. They finished the season 18–16, 9–7 in Big South play to finish in a four-way tie for fifth place. They defeated UCS Upstate and Winthrop to advance to the semifinals of the Big South tournament where they lost to Radford. They were invited to the CollegeInsider.com Tournament where they defeated Florida Atlantic in the first round before falling in the second round to fellow Big South member Hampton.

== Previous season ==
The Buccaneers They finished the season 15–16, 9–9 in Big South play to finish in a four-way tie for fifth place. As the No. 8 seed in the Big South tournament, they defeated Presbyterian in the first round before losing in the quarterfinals to UNC Asheville.

== Roster ==
2018–19 Charleston Southern Buccaneers men's basketball team
Players
Coaches

Pos.	#	Name	Height	Weight	Year	Hometown
G	0	Travis Anderson	6 ft 0 in (1.83 m)	175 lb (79 kg)	Fr	Loganville, Georgia
F	1	Travis McConico	6 ft 6 in (1.98 m)	200 lb (91 kg)	Sr	Jacksonville, Florida
G	2	Nate Louis	5 ft 11 in (1.8 m)	165 lb (75 kg)	Jr	Miami, Florida
G	4	Deontaye Buskey	6 ft 1 in (1.85 m)	160 lb (73 kg)	So	Daphne, Alabama
F	5	Jamir Moore	6 ft 5 in (1.96 m)	180 lb (82 kg)	Fr	Miramar, Florida
G	11	Christian Keeling	6 ft 4 in (1.93 m)	175 lb (79 kg)	Jr	Augusta, Georgia
F	12	Ty Jones	6 ft 6 in (1.98 m)	215 lb (98 kg)	So	Pontotoc, Mississippi
F	13	Timmy Sellers	6 ft 8 in (2.03 m)	220 lb (100 kg)	Fr	Augusta, Georgia
G	15	Duncan LeXander	6 ft 8 in (2.03 m)	205 lb (93 kg)	Fr	Davidson, North Carolina
G	20	Brian Camacho	6 ft 0 in (1.83 m)	160 lb (73 kg)	Fr	Spartanburg, South Carolina
F	21	Nathan Payne	6 ft 4 in (1.93 m)	180 lb (82 kg)	RS So	Pickens, South Carolina
C	22	Sadarius Bowser	6 ft 9 in (2.06 m)	220 lb (100 kg)	RS Fr	Gaffney, South Carolina
F	23	Sean Price	6 ft 3 in (1.91 m)	200 lb (91 kg)	So	Port Charlotte, Florida
G	24	Phlandrous Jr. Fleming	6 ft 4 in (1.93 m)	195 lb (88 kg)	So	Athens, Georgia
F	33	Dontrell Shuler	6 ft 2 in (1.88 m)	180 lb (82 kg)	Fr	Columbia, South Carolina

Head coach

- Barclay Radebaugh (ETSU)

Assistant coach(es)

- Rick Duckett (North Carolina)
- Thomas Butters (Clemson)
- Arlon Harper (Charleston Southern)

Legend

- (C) Team captain
- (S) Suspended
- (I) Ineligible
- (W) Walk-on
- Injured
- Current redshirt

Roster
Last update: October 25, 2018

== Schedule and results ==
Date time, TV	Rank^{#}	Opponent^{#}	Result	Record	Site (attendance) city, state
Exhibition
Oct 30, 2018*; 7:00 pm		at Georgia Southern; Fundraiser for American Red Cross	L 61–79		Hanner Fieldhouse; Statesboro, GA
Non-conference regular season
Nov 6, 2018*; 7:30 pm, ESPN+		Columbia International	W 100–68	1–0	CSU Field House (788); North Charleston, SC
Nov 9, 2018*; 7:00 pm, SECN+		at Florida; Battle 4 Atlantis	L 46–76	1–1	O'Connell Center (10,072); Gainesville, FL
Nov 13, 2018*; 7:30 pm, ESPN+		South Carolina State	W 89–72	2–1	CSU Field House (917); North Charleston, SC
Nov 16, 2018*; 7:30 pm		at Middle Tennessee; Battle 4 Atlantis	L 73–76	2–2	Murphy Center (3,945); Murfreesboro, TN
Nov 19, 2018*; 7:30 pm, ESPN+		Trinity Baptist; Battle 4 Atlantis	W 98–49	3–2	CSU Field House (480); North Charleston, SC
Nov 23, 2018*; 3:30 pm		vs. Coppin State; Battle 4 Atlantis	W 93–67	4–2	Jerry Richardson Indoor Stadium (400); Spartanburg, SC
Nov 27, 2018*; 8:00 pm, FSWI		at Marquette	L 55–76	4–3	Fiserv Forum (12,892); Milwaukee, WI
Dec 1, 2018*; 5:30 pm, ESPN+		North Florida	L 70–76	4–4	CSU Field House (782); North Charleston, SC
Dec 11, 2018*; 7:00 pm, ESPN3		at No. 23 Furman	L 69–77	4–5	Timmons Arena (2,210); Greenville, SC
Dec 15, 2018*; 5:00 pm, ESPN+		at North Florida	L 61–68	4–6	UNF Arena (1,282); Jacksonville, FL
Dec 18, 2018*; 7:00 pm, ACCN Extra		at Clemson	L 51–78	4–7	Littlejohn Coliseum (6,757); Clemson, SC
Dec 21, 2018*; 7:30 pm, ESPN+		Johnson & Wales (NC)	W 86–61	5–7	CSU Field House (301); North Charleston, SC
Dec 30, 2018*; 5:30 pm, ESPN+		Piedmont International	W 111–65	6–7	CSU Field House (425); North Charleston, SC
Big South regular season
Jan 5, 2019; 5:30 pm, ESPN+		High Point	W 51–50	6–8 (0–1)	CSU Field House (675); North Charleston, SC
Jan 10, 2019; 7:00 pm, ESPN+		at Hampton	W 94–82	6–9 (0–2)	Hampton Convocation Center (4,512); Hampton, VA
Jan 12, 2019; 3:00 pm, ESPN+		at Longwood	W 101–91	7–9 (1–2)	Willett Hall (1,084); Farmville, VA
Jan 19, 2019; 5:30 pm, ESPN+		Campbell	L 72–73	7–10 (1–3)	CSU Field House (727); North Charleston, SC
Jan 24, 2019; 7:00 pm, ESPN+		at Radford	L 78–86	7–11 (1–4)	Dedmon Center (2,107); Radford, VA
Jan 26, 2019; 5:30 pm, ESPN+		Gardner–Webb	W 74–60	8–11 (2–4)	CSU Field House (628); North Charleston, SC
Jan 30, 2019; 7:30 pm, ESPN+		Presbyterian	W 85–84	9–11 (3–4)	CSU Field House (785); North Charleston, SC
Feb 2, 2019; 4:30 pm, ESPN+		at USC Upstate	W 90–71	10–11 (4–4)	G. B. Hodge Center (809); Spartanburg, SC
Feb 7, 2019; 7:30 pm, ESPN+		Winthrop	L 72–76	10–12 (4–5)	CSU Field House (733); North Charleston, SC
Feb 9, 2019; 4:30 pm, ESPN+		at UNC Asheville	W 85–75	11–12 (5–5)	Kimmel Arena (1,743); Asheville, NC
Feb 13, 2019; 4:30 pm, ESPN+		at Gardner–Webb	L 74–77	11–13 (5–6)	Paul Porter Arena (1,150); Boiling Springs, NC
Feb 16, 2019; 5:30 pm, ESPN+		Radford	W 53–52	12–13 (6–6)	CSU Field House (787); North Charleston, SC
Feb 21, 2019; 7:30 pm, ESPN+		USC Upstate	W 92–60	13–13 (7–6)	CSU Field House (812); North Charleston, SC
Feb 23, 2019; 2:00 pm, ESPN3		at Winthrop	L 78–80 ^{2OT}	13–14 (7–7)	Winthrop Coliseum (3,755); Rock Hill, SC
Feb 27, 2019; 7:30 pm, ESPN+		UNC Asheville	W 77–48	14–14 (8–7)	CSU Field House (696); North Charleston, SC
Mar 2, 2019; 4:00 pm, ESPN+		at Presbyterian	W 72–65	15–14 (9–7)	Templeton Center (774); Clinton, SC
Big South tournament
Mar 5, 2019; 7:00 pm, ESPN3	(6)	(11) USC Upstate; First round	W 71–52	16–14	CSU Field House (757); North Charleston, SC
Mar 7, 2019; 2:00 pm, ESPN3	(6)	vs. (3) Winthrop; Quarterfinals	W 77–63	17–14	Gore Arena (1,460); Buies Creek, NC
Mar 8, 2019; 6:00 pm, ESPN+	(6)	vs. (2) Radford; Semifinals	L 54–63	17–15	Gore Arena (3,090); Buies Creek, NC
CollegeInsider.com Postseason tournament
Mar 21, 2019*; 7:00 pm, watchcit.com		Florida Atlantic; First round	W 68–66	18–15	CSU Field House (696); North Charleston, SC
Mar 26, 2019*; 7:00 pm, watchcit.com		at Hampton; Second round	L 67–73	18–16	Hampton Convocation Center (3,523); Hampton, VA
*Non-conference game. ^{#}Rankings from AP Poll. (#) Tournament seedings in parentheses. All times are in Eastern Time Source.
