= 2018–19 Presbyterian Blue Hose men's basketball team =

American college basketball season

2018–19 Presbyterian Blue Hose men's basketball
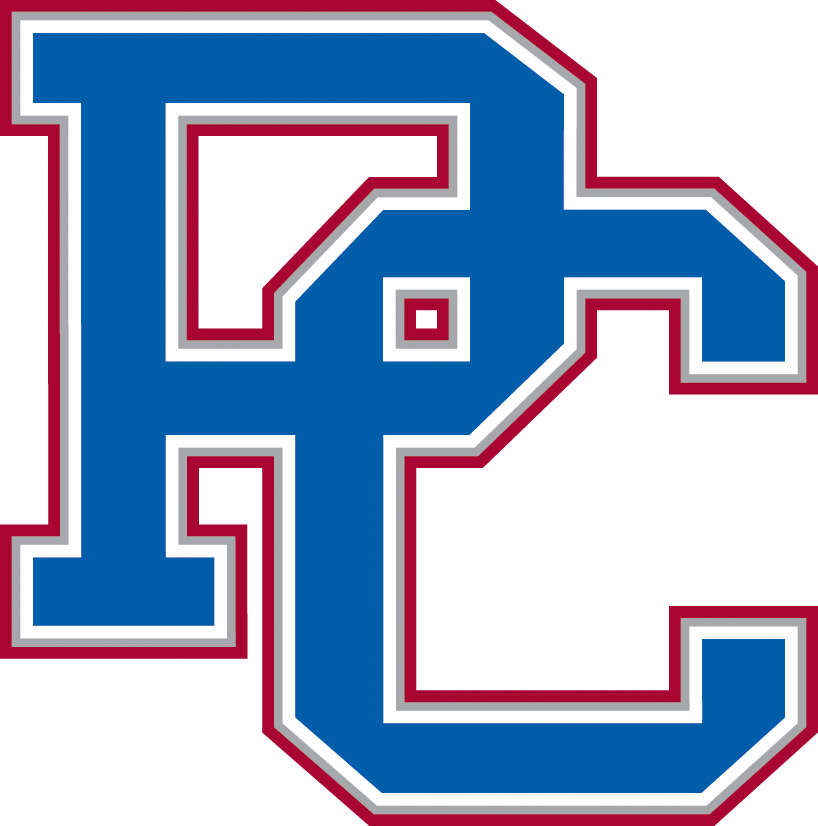

CIT, quarterfinals
- Conference: Big South Conference
- Record: 20–16 (9–7 Big South)
- Head coach: Dustin Kerns (2nd season)
- Assistant coaches: Bob Szorc; Frank Young; Patrick Moynihan
- Home arena: Templeton Physical Education Center

2018–19 Big South men's basketball standings
	Conf.				Overall
Team	W		L	PCT	W		L	PCT
Campbell	12	–	4	.750	20	–	13	.606
Radford	12	–	4	.750	22	–	11	.667
Winthrop	10	–	6	.625	18	–	12	.600
Gardner–Webb †	10	–	6	.625	23	–	12	.657
High Point	9	–	7	.563	16	–	15	.516
Charleston Southern	9	–	7	.563	18	–	16	.529
Presbyterian	9	–	7	.563	20	–	16	.556
Hampton	9	–	7	.563	18	–	17	.514
Longwood	5	–	11	.313	16	–	18	.471
UNC Asheville	2	–	14	.125	4	–	27	.129
USC Upstate	1	–	15	.063	6	–	26	.188
† 2019 Big South tournament winner

The 2018–19 Presbyterian Blue Hose men's basketball team represented Presbyterian College during the 2018–19 NCAA Division I men's basketball season. The Blue Hose, led by second-year head coach Dustin Kerns, played their home games at the Templeton Physical Education Center in Clinton, South Carolina as members of the Big South Conference. They finished the season 20–16, 9–7 in Big South play, to finish in a four-way tie for fifth place. They defeated UNC Asheville in the first round of the Big South tournament before losing in the quarterfinals to Radford. They were invited to the CollegeInsider.com Tournament, their first-ever Division I postseason tournament, where they defeated Seattle and Robert Morris to advance to the quarterfinals where they lost to Marshall.

== Previous season ==
The Blue Hose finished the 2017–18 season 11–21, 4–14 in Big South play, to finish in ninth place. They lost in the first round of the Big South tournament to Charleston Southern.

== Roster ==
2018–19 Presbyterian Blue Hose men's basketball team
Players
Coaches

Pos.	#	Name	Height	Weight	Year	Hometown
G	0	Chris Martin	6 ft 0 in (1.83 m)	181 lb (82 kg)	Fr	Charlotte, NC
G	2	Kody Shubert	5 ft 11 in (1.8 m)	160 lb (73 kg)	Fr	Madison, NC
G	3	Romeo Crouch	6 ft 3 in (1.91 m)	175 lb (79 kg)	So	Titusville, FL
F	4	Ben Drake	6 ft 8 in (2.03 m)	225 lb (102 kg)	RS Jr	Kennesaw, GA
G	5	Davon Bell	5 ft 10 in (1.78 m)	175 lb (79 kg)	RS Sr	Charlotte, NC
G	10	Adam Flagler	6 ft 3 in (1.91 m)	170 lb (77 kg)	Fr	Duluth, GA
C	11	Armel TeTe	6 ft 9 in (2.06 m)	210 lb (95 kg)	Jr	Fayetteville, NC
F	12	Cory Hightower	6 ft 7 in (2.01 m)	215 lb (98 kg)	Fr	Norcross, GA
G	13	Tristen Becker	6 ft 3 in (1.91 m)	190 lb (86 kg)	RS Jr	Chicago, IL
F	15	Francois Lewis	6 ft 9 in (2.06 m)	230 lb (104 kg)	RS Sr	Orlando, FL
G	22	Maleek Catchings	6 ft 4 in (1.93 m)	240 lb (109 kg)	Sr	Marietta, GA
G	23	Jordan Gibson	6 ft 5 in (1.96 m)	190 lb (86 kg)	Fr	Bristow, VA
G	25	JC Younger	6 ft 4 in (1.93 m)	200 lb (91 kg)	Jr	Mandeville, LA
G	30	Jamie Baker	5 ft 11 in (1.8 m)	155 lb (70 kg)	So	Concord, NC
G	32	Ethan Kay	6 ft 0 in (1.83 m)	185 lb (84 kg)	Sr	Orange Park, FL

Head coach

- Dustin Kerns (Clemson)

Assistant coach(es)

- Bob Szorc (St. John's)
- Frank Young (West Virginia)
- Patrick Moynihan (North Georgia)

Legend

- (C) Team captain
- (S) Suspended
- (I) Ineligible
- (W) Walk-on
- Injured
- Current redshirt

Roster
Last update: October 21, 2024

== Schedule and results ==
Date time, TV	Rank^{#}	Opponent^{#}	Result	Record	Site (attendance) city, state
Non-conference regular season
November 6, 2018*; 7:00 p.m.		at College of Charleston	L 73–85	0–1	TD Arena (3,711); Charleston, SC
November 10, 2018*; 7:00 p.m., ESPN+		at Tennessee Tech	W 80–65	1–1	Eblen Center (1,183); Cookeville, TN
November 12, 2018*; 7:00 p.m., ESPN+		Welch	W 109–57	2–1	Templeton Center (360); Clinton, SC
November 15, 2018*; 1:00 p.m., ESPN+		Boyce	W 102–49	3–1	Templeton Center (185); Clinton, SC
November 17, 2018*; 1:00 p.m., FSN		at No. 24 Marquette	L 55–74	3–2	Fiserv Forum (14,058); Milwaukee, WI
November 19, 2018*; 11:00 p.m., P12N		at No. 17 UCLA	L 65–80	3–3	Pauley Pavilion (6,076); Los Angeles, CA
November 28, 2018*; 7:00 p.m., ESPN+		St. Francis Brooklyn	L 86–90	3–4	Templeton Center (409); Clinton, SC
December 1, 2018*; 4:00 p.m.		at North Carolina A&T	W 75–70	4–4	Corbett Sports Center (954); Greensboro, NC
December 4, 2018*; 7:00 p.m., ESPN+		Jacksonville	L 88–94	4–5	Templeton Center (525); Clinton, SC
December 12, 2018*; 7:30 p.m., ESPN+		VMI	W 103–70	5–5	Templeton Center (373); Clinton, SC
December 15, 2018*; 2:00 p.m., ESPN+		Trinity (FL)	W 87–44	6–5	Templeton Center (251); Clinton, SC
December 18, 2018*; 8:30 p.m., FS1		at Butler	L 67–76	6–6	Hinkle Fieldhouse (6,821); Indianapolis, IN
December 22, 2018*; 2:00 p.m., ESPN+		at Dayton	L 69–81	6–7	UD Arena (13,147); Dayton, OH
December 30, 2018*; 2:00 p.m., ESPN+		at Jacksonville	W 72–67	7–7	Swisher Gymnasium (525); Jacksonville, FL
January 2, 2019*; 6:00 p.m., ESPN+		at South Carolina State	W 72–70	8–7	SHM Memorial Center (249); Orangeburg, SC
Big South regular season
January 5, 2019; 4:00 p.m., ESPN+		USC Upstate	W 64–61	9–7 (1–0)	Templeton Center (406); Clinton, SC
January 10, 2019; 7:00 p.m., ESPN+		at High Point	L 58–74	9–8 (1–1)	Millis Athletic Convocation Center (1,287); High Point, NC
January 12, 2019; 4:30 p.m., ESPN+		at Radford	L 77–79–	9–9 (1–2)	Dedmon Center (959); Radford, VA
January 16, 2019; 7:00 p.m., ESPN+		Hampton	W 85–70	10–9 (2–2)	Templeton Center (340); Clinton, SC
January 19, 2019; 4:00 p.m., ESPN+		Longwood	W 71–64	11–9 (3–2)	Templeton Center (535); Clinton, SC
January 21, 2019; 4:00 p.m., ESPN+		at USC Upstate	W 68–59	12–9 (4–2)	G. B. Hodge Center (644); Spartanburg, SC
January 24, 2019; 7:00 p.m., ESPN+		at Campbell	L 73–77	12–10 (4–3)	Gore Arena (1,783); Buies Creek, NC
January 26, 2019; 4:00 p.m., ESPN+		Winthrop	W 99–91	13–10 (5–3)	Templeton Center (905); Clinton, SC
January 30, 2019; 7:30 p.m., ESPN+		at Charleston Southern	L 84–85	13–11 (5–4)	CSU Field House (785); North Charleston, SC
February 7, 2019; 7:00 p.m., ESPN+		UNC Asheville	W 67–44	14–11 (6–4)	Templeton Center (610); Clinton, SC
February 9, 2019; 4:30 p.m., ESPN+		Gardner–Webb	W 103–101 ^{OT}	15–11 (7–4)	Templeton Center (596); Clinton, SC
February 13, 2019; 7:00 p.m., ESPN+		at Winthrop	L 85–93	15–12 (7–5)	Winthrop Coliseum (1,202); Rock Hill, SC
February 16, 2019; 4:30 p.m., ESPN+		Campbell	W 76–71	16–12 (8–5)	Templeton Center (1,003); Clinton, SC
February 23, 2019; 4:30 p.m., ESPN+		at UNC Asheville	W 71–55	17–12 (9–5)	Kimmel Arena (2,322); Asheville, NC
February 27, 2019; 7:00 p.m., ESPN+		at Gardner–Webb	L 70–78	17–13 (9–6)	Paul Porter Arena (1,285); Boiling Springs, NC
March 2, 2019; 4:00 p.m., ESPN+		Charleston Southern	L 65–72	17–14 (9–7)	Templeton Center (774); Clinton, SC
Big South tournament
March 5, 2019; 7:00 p.m., ESPN3	(7)	(10) UNC Asheville; First round	W 106–59	18–14	Templeton Center (805); Clinton, SC
March 7, 2019; 12:00 p.m., ESPN3	(7)	vs. (2) Radford; Quarterfinals	L 76–84	18–15	Gore Arena (1,460); Buies Creek, NC
CollegeInsider.com Postseason Tournament
March 20, 2019*; 10:00 p.m., CBS Sports Live		at Seattle; First round	W 72–68	19–15	Redhawk Center (472); Seattle, WA
March 24, 2019*; 1:00 p.m., CBS Sports Live		at Robert Morris; Second round	W 77–70	20–15	North Athletic Complex (541); Pittsburgh, PA
March 26, 2019*; 7:00 p.m.		at Marshall; Quarterfinals	L 66–83	20–16	Cam Henderson Center (3,383); Huntington, WV
*Non-conference game. ^{#}Rankings from AP poll. (#) Tournament seedings in parentheses. All times are in Eastern.
