= 2018–19 Big South Conference men's basketball season =

- League: NCAA Division I
- Sport: Basketball
- Duration: November 2018 through March 2019
- Teams: 11

Regular Season
- Champion: Campbell & Radford
- Season MVP: Chris Clemons, Campbell

Tournament
- Champions: Gardner-Webb
- Runners-up: Radford
- Finals MVP: D.J. Laster - Gardner-Webb

Big South Conference men's basketball seasons
- ← 2017–18 2019–20 →

2018–19 Big South men's basketball standings
	Conf.				Overall
Team	W		L	PCT	W		L	PCT
Campbell	12	–	4	.750	20	–	13	.606
Radford	12	–	4	.750	22	–	11	.667
Winthrop	10	–	6	.625	18	–	12	.600
Gardner–Webb †	10	–	6	.625	23	–	12	.657
High Point	9	–	7	.563	16	–	15	.516
Charleston Southern	9	–	7	.563	18	–	16	.529
Presbyterian	9	–	7	.563	20	–	16	.556
Hampton	9	–	7	.563	18	–	17	.514
Longwood	5	–	11	.313	16	–	18	.471
UNC Asheville	2	–	14	.125	4	–	27	.129
USC Upstate	1	–	15	.063	6	–	26	.188
† 2019 Big South tournament winner

The 2018–19 Big South Conference men's basketball season began with practices in October 2018, followed by the start of the 2018–19 NCAA Division I men's basketball season in November. Conference play began in January 2019 and concluded in February 2019. The season marked the 35th season of Big South Conference basketball.

On December 21, 2018, Campbell's Chris Clemons became the all-time leading scorer in Big South history. He passed VMI guard Reggie Williams' 2,556 career point total in a game against Austin Peay.

== Preseason ==
=== Conference realignment ===
During the 2018 offseason, one school left the Big South and two joined.

On successive days in November 2017, two schools were unveiled as incoming members—former ASUN Conference member USC Upstate on the 15th, followed by former MEAC member Hampton.

Liberty, which had started a transition to FBS football in the 2017 season, had initially reached an agreement with the Big South that it would continue to house all of its other sports (except for field hockey and women's swimming, neither of which is sponsored by the Big South) in that conference after becoming classified as an FBS independent from the 2018 season forward. However, in May 2018, Liberty changed course, announcing that all of its other Big South sports would instead move to the ASUN.

=== Coaching changes ===
- On March 2, 2018, Longwood head coach Jayson Gee was fired. He finished at Longwood with a five-year record of 42–120. On March 22, the school hired UMBC assistant Griff Aldrich as head coach.
- On March 7, 2018, High Point head coach Scott Cherry and the school mutually agreed to part ways after 9 seasons. On March 26, the school hired High Point alumnus Tubby Smith as head coach.
- On March 24, 2018, UNC Asheville coach Nick McDevitt accepted the head coaching job at Middle Tennessee. He finished at UNC Asheville with a five-year record of 98–65. On April 11, the school hired Texas assistant Mike Morrell.

=== Preseason poll ===
Rank	Team
1	Radford (28)
2	Winthrop (2)
3	Hampton (2)
4	Campbell
5	Charleston Southern
6	Gardner–Webb (1)
7	High Point
8	UNC Asheville
9	Presbyterian
10	Longwood
11	USC Upstate

() first place votes

=== Preseason All-Conference Teams ===
Award	Recipients
First Team	Chris Clemons (Campbell); Ed Polite (Radford); Christian Keeling (Charleston Southern); David Efianayi (Gardner-Webb); Jermaine Marrow (Hampton)
Second Team	Carlik Jones (Radford); Jahaad Proctor (High Point); Josh Ferguson (Winthrop); Isaiah Walton (Longwood); Deion Holmes (USC Upstate)

Big South Preseason Player of the Year: Chris Clemons (Campbell)
