= 2019 Big South Conference men's basketball tournament =

- Classification: Division I
- Season: 2018–19
- Teams: 11
- Site: Campus sites (first round); Gore Arena (quarterfinals and semifinals); Dedmon Center (championship)
- Champions: Gardner–Webb (1st title)
- Winning coach: Tim Craft (1st title)
- MVP: D. J. Laster (Gardner–Webb)
- Television: ESPN3, ESPN+, ESPN

2018–19 Big South men's basketball standings
	Conf.				Overall
Team	W		L	PCT	W		L	PCT
Campbell	12	–	4	.750	20	–	13	.606
Radford	12	–	4	.750	22	–	11	.667
Winthrop	10	–	6	.625	18	–	12	.600
Gardner–Webb †	10	–	6	.625	23	–	12	.657
High Point	9	–	7	.563	16	–	15	.516
Charleston Southern	9	–	7	.563	18	–	16	.529
Presbyterian	9	–	7	.563	20	–	16	.556
Hampton	9	–	7	.563	18	–	17	.514
Longwood	5	–	11	.313	16	–	18	.471
UNC Asheville	2	–	14	.125	4	–	27	.129
USC Upstate	1	–	15	.063	6	–	26	.188
† 2019 Big South tournament winner

The 2019 Big South men's basketball tournament was the postseason men's basketball tournament that ended the 2018–19 season of the Big South Conference. It was held from March 5 through March 10, 2019 at various campus sites. Gardner–Webb defeated Radford 76–65 in the championship game to win the tournament, and received the conference's automatic bid to the NCAA tournament. It was the first title for Gardner–Webb after 11 years in the Big South, and their first trip to the NCAA Tournament in school history.

== Sites ==
The first round was played at campus sites at the home of the higher seed. The quarterfinals and semifinals were played at Gore Arena in Buies Creek, North Carolina, home of regular-season champion Campbell. The championship game was held at the Dedmon Center in Radford, Virginia, the home arena of the highest surviving seed, Radford.

== Seeds ==
All 11 conference teams were eligible for the tournament. The top five teams received a first-round bye. Teams were seeded by record within the conference, with a tiebreaker system to seed teams with identical conference records.

Seed	School	Conference	Overall	Tiebreaker 1	Tiebreaker 2
1	Campbell	12–4	19–11	2–0 vs. Radford	
2	Radford	12–4	20–10	0–2 vs. Campbell	
3	Winthrop	10–6	18–11	1–1 vs. Gardner–Webb	1–2 vs. Campbell/Radford
4	Gardner–Webb	10–6	20–11	1–1 vs. Winthrop	0–2 vs. Campbell/Radford
5	High Point	9–7	16–14	4–0 vs. CHSO/Pres/Hampton	
6	Charleston Southern	9–7	15–14	2–2 vs. HP/Pres/Hampton	
7	Presbyterian	9–7	17–14	1–3 vs. HP/CHSO/Hampton	1–0 vs. Hampton
8	Hampton	9–7	14–15	1–3 vs. HP/CHSO/Pres	0–1 vs. Pres
9	Longwood	5–11	15–16		
10	UNC Asheville	2–14	4–26		
11	USC Upstate	1–15	6–25		

== Schedule ==
Game	Time*	Matchup No.	Score	Television
First round - Tuesday, March 5 Campus sites
1	7:00 pm	No. 10 UNC Asheville at No. 7 Presbyterian	59–106	ESPN3
2	7:00 pm	No. 11 USC Upstate at No. 6 Charleston Southern	52–71	ESPN3
3	7:00 pm	No. 9 Longwood at No. 8 Hampton	71–77	ESPN3
Quarterfinals - Thursday, March 7 at Gore Arena; Buies Creek, NC
4	12:00 pm	No. 7 Presbyterian vs. No. 2 Radford	76–84	ESPN3
5	2:00 pm	No. 6 Charleston Southern vs. No. 3 Winthrop	77–63	ESPN3
6	6:00 pm	No. 8 Hampton vs. No. 1 Campbell	77–86	ESPN3
7	8:00 pm	No. 5 High Point vs. No. 4 Gardner–Webb	69–75	ESPN3
Semifinals - Friday, March 8 at Gore Arena; Buies Creek, NC
8	6:00 pm	No. 6. Charleston Southern vs. No. 2 Radford	54–63	ESPN+
9	8:00 pm	No. 4 Gardner–Webb vs. No. 1 Campbell	79–74	ESPN+
Championship - Sunday, March 10 at Dedmon Center; Radford, VA
10	1:00 pm	No. 4 Gardner–Webb vs. No. 2 Radford	76–65	ESPN
*Game times in ET. Rankings denote tournament seeding.

== Bracket ==
First round Tuesday, March 5 ESPN3
8	Hampton	77
9	Longwood	71
7	Presbyterian	106
10	UNC Asheville	59
6	Charleston Southern	71
11	USC Upstate	52

Quarterfinals; Thursday, March 7 ESPN3
1	Campbell	86
8	Hampton	77
4	Gardner–Webb	75
5	High Point	69
2	Radford	84
7	Presbyterian	76
3	Winthrop	63
6	Charleston Southern	77

Semifinals; Friday, March 8 ESPN+
1	Campbell	74
4	Gardner–Webb	79
2	Radford	63
6	Charleston Southern	54

Championship; Sunday, March 10; ESPN
4	Gardner–Webb	76
2	Radford	65
