= 2018–19 UNC Asheville Bulldogs men's basketball team =

American college basketball season

2018–19 UNC Asheville Bulldogs men's basketball
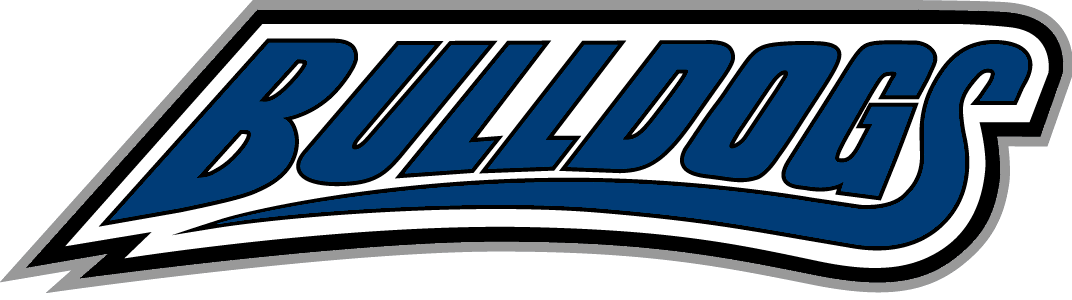
- Conference: Big South Conference
- Record: 4–27 (2–14 Big South)
- Head coach: Mike Morrell (1st season)
- Assistant coaches: Kyle Perry; R.J. Evans; Mike Moynihan
- Home arena: Kimmel Arena

2018–19 Big South men's basketball standings
	Conf.				Overall
Team	W		L	PCT	W		L	PCT
Campbell	12	–	4	.750	20	–	13	.606
Radford	12	–	4	.750	22	–	11	.667
Winthrop	10	–	6	.625	18	–	12	.600
Gardner–Webb †	10	–	6	.625	23	–	12	.657
High Point	9	–	7	.563	16	–	15	.516
Charleston Southern	9	–	7	.563	18	–	16	.529
Presbyterian	9	–	7	.563	20	–	16	.556
Hampton	9	–	7	.563	18	–	17	.514
Longwood	5	–	11	.313	16	–	18	.471
UNC Asheville	2	–	14	.125	4	–	27	.129
USC Upstate	1	–	15	.063	6	–	26	.188
† 2019 Big South tournament winner

The 2018–19 UNC Asheville Bulldogs men's basketball team represented the University of North Carolina at Asheville during the 2018–19 NCAA Division I men's basketball season. The Bulldogs, led by first-year head coach Mike Morrell, played their home games at Kimmel Arena as members of the Big South Conference.

== Previous season ==
The Bulldogs finished the season 21–13, 13–5 in Big South play to win the Big South regular season championship. They defeated Charleston Southern in the quarterfinals of the Big South tournament before being upset in the semifinals by Liberty. As a regular season conference champion who failed to win their conference tournament, they received an automatic bid to the National Invitation Tournament where they lost in the first round to USC.

On March 24, 2018, head coach Nick McDevitt accepted the head coaching job at Middle Tennessee. He finished at UNC Asheville with a five-year record of 98–65.

== Roster ==
2018–19 UNC Asheville Bulldogs men's basketball team
Players
Coaches

Pos.	#	Name	Height	Weight	Year	Hometown
F	0	Donovan Gilmore	6 ft 8 in (2.03 m)	210 lb (95 kg)	Sr	Greensboro, North Carolina
G	1	Cress Worthy	6 ft 2 in (1.88 m)	170 lb (77 kg)	Fr	Gastonia, North Carolina
G	3	Tajion Jones	6 ft 5 in (1.96 m)	185 lb (84 kg)	Fr	Oak Ridge, Tennessee
G	4	LJ Thorpe	6 ft 5 in (1.96 m)	210 lb (95 kg)	RS Fr	West Palm Beach, Florida
F	5	Stephen Edoka	6 ft 4 in (1.93 m)	205 lb (93 kg)	Fr	Abuja, Nigeria
G	11	Jalen Seegars	6 ft 4 in (1.93 m)	220 lb (100 kg)	So	Greensboro, North Carolina
G	12	Lavar Batts, Jr.	6 ft 3 in (1.91 m)	185 lb (84 kg)	So	High Point, North Carolina
F	14	Luke Lawson	6 ft 7 in (2.01 m)	180 lb (82 kg)	Fr	Coeburn, Virginia
F	15	Grant Townsend	6 ft 7 in (2.01 m)	205 lb (93 kg)	RS So	Riverview, Florida
G	20	Devon Baker	6 ft 2 in (1.88 m)	190 lb (86 kg)	Fr	Dayton, Ohio
F	21	Jax Levitch	6 ft 7 in (2.01 m)	195 lb (88 kg)	Jr	Louisville, Kentucky
F	22	Coty Jude	6 ft 9 in (2.06 m)	185 lb (84 kg)	Fr	Fort Gay, West Virginia
G	30	Deacon Heath	6 ft 0 in (1.83 m)	170 lb (77 kg)	Fr	Banner Elk, North Carolina
G	33	Cameron Woodyard	6 ft 3 in (1.91 m)	185 lb (84 kg)	So	Charlotte, North Carolina
G	34	Jeremy Peck	6 ft 9 in (2.06 m)	240 lb (109 kg)	RS So	Houston, Texas

Head coach

- Mike Morrell (Milligan)

Assistant coach(es)

- Kyle Perry (Georgia Tech)
- R.J. Evans (UConn)
- Mike Moynihan (North Georgia)

Legend

- (C) Team captain
- (S) Suspended
- (I) Ineligible
- (W) Walk-on
- Injured
- Current redshirt

Roster
Last update: October 29, 2018

== Schedule and results ==
Date time, TV	Rank^{#}	Opponent^{#}	Result	Record	Site (attendance) city, state
Non-conference regular season
Nov 8, 2018*; 7:00 pm, WMYA		St. Andrews	W 87–47	1–0	Kimmel Arena (1,523); Asheville, NC
Nov 13, 2018*; 7:00 pm, ACCN Extra		at NC State	L 49–100	1–1	PNC Arena (13,620); Raleigh, NC
Nov 16, 2018*; 7:00 pm, ESPN3		at Northern Kentucky; NKU Basketball Classic	L 50–77	1–2	BB&T Arena (2,936); Highland Heights, KY
Nov 17, 2018*; 4:30 pm, ESPN3		vs. Coastal Carolina; NKU Basketball Classic	L 52–78	1–3	BB&T Arena (273); Highland Heights, KY
Nov 18, 2018*; 3:30 pm, ESPN3		vs. Manhattan; NKU Basketball Classic	L 38–54	1–4	BB&T Arena (113); Highland Heights, KY
Nov 25, 2018*; 4:00 pm, ESPN+		Furman	L 51–65	1–5	Kimmel Arena (2,186); Asheville, NC
Dec 1, 2018*; 8:30 pm, ESPN+		at UT Martin	L 70–87	1–6	Skyhawk Arena (1,660); Martin, TN
Dec 4, 2018*; 8:00 pm, SECN		at No. 8 Auburn	L 41–67	1–7	Auburn Arena (7,121); Auburn, AL
Dec 8, 2018*; 5:30 pm, ESPN+		Western Carolina	L 59–71	1–8	Kimmel Arena (1,702); Asheville, NC
Dec 15, 2018*; 7:00 pm, ESPN+		at Wofford	L 49–92	1–9	Jerry Richardson Indoor Stadium (1,555); Spartanburg, SC
Dec 18, 2018*; 7:00 pm, ESPN+		at Stetson	L 74–80	1–10	Edmunds Center (270); DeLand, FL
Dec 21, 2018*; 2:00 pm, ESPN+		Milligan	W 86–76	2–10	Kimmel Arena (1,253); Asheville, NC
Dec 29, 2018*; 2:00 pm, ESPN+		Fayetteville State	L 63–80	2–11	Kimmel Arena (1,217); Asheville, NC
Dec 31, 2018*; 1:00 pm, SECN+		at Vanderbilt	L 59–90	2–12	Memorial Gymnasium (8,350); Nashville, TN
Big South Conference regular season
Jan 5, 2019; 2:00 pm, ESPN+		Winthrop	L 65-80	2–13 (0–1)	Kimmel Arena (1,847); Asheville, NC
Jan 10, 2019; 7:00 pm, ESPN+		at Longwood	L 62–67	2–14 (0–2)	Willett Hall (1,024); Farmville, VA
Jan 12, 2019; 4:00 pm, ESPN+		at Hampton	L 61–83	2–15 (0–3)	Hampton Convocation Center (3,512); Hampton, VA
Jan 16, 2019; 7:00 pm, ESPN+		Campbell	L 53–70	2–16 (0–4)	Kimmel Arena (1,528); Asheville, NC
Jan 19, 2019; 4:30 pm, ESPN+		Radford	L 63–71	2–17 (0–5)	Kimmel Arena (2,314); Asheville, NC
Jan 21, 2019; 2:00 pm, ESPN+		at Winthrop	L 45–66	2–18 (0–6)	Winthrop Coliseum (1,674); Rock Hill, SC
Jan 26, 2019; 7:00 pm, ESPN+		at High Point	L 61–65	2–19 (0–7)	Millis Center (1,708); High Point, NC
Jan 30, 2019; 7:00 pm, ESPN+		USC Upstate	W 71–62	3–19 (1–7)	Kimmel Arena (1,816); Asheville, NC
Feb 2, 2019; 3:00 pm, ESPN+		at Gardner–Webb	L 81–82 ^{OT}	3–20 (1–8)	Paul Porter Arena (1,785); Boiling Springs, NC
Feb 7, 2019; 7:00 pm, ESPN+		at Presbyterian	L 44–67	3–21 (1–9)	Templeton Center (610); Clinton, SC
Feb 9, 2019; 2:00 pm, ESPN+		Charleston Southern	L 75–85	3–22 (1–10)	Kimmel Arena (1,743); Asheville, NC
Feb 13, 2019; 7:00 pm, ESPN+		at USC Upstate	W 57–53	4–22 (2–10)	G. B. Hodge Center (550); Spartanburg, SC
Feb 21, 2019; 7:00 pm, ESPN+		Gardner–Webb	L 55–65	4–23 (2–11)	Kimmel Arena (1,763); Asheville, NC
Feb 23, 2019; 4:30 pm, ESPN+		Presbyterian	L 55–71	4–24 (2–12)	Kimmel Arena (2,322); Asheville, NC
Feb 27, 2019; 7:30 pm, ESPN+		at Charleston Southern	L 48–77	4–25 (2–13)	CSU Field House (696); North Charleston, SC
Mar 2, 2019; 4:30 pm, ESPN+		High Point	L 74–79	4–26 (2–14)	Kimmel Arena (2,736); Asheville, NC
Big South tournament
Mar 5, 2019; 7:00 pm, ESPN3	(10)	at (7) Presbyterian; First round	L 59–106	4–27	Templeton Center (805); Clinton, SC
*Non-conference game. ^{#}Rankings from AP Poll. (#) Tournament seedings in parentheses. All times are in Eastern Time Source.
