= 2019 CollegeInsider.com Postseason Tournament =

Postseason single-elimination tournament of NCAA Division I basketball teams

- Season: 2018–19
- Teams: 26
- Finals site: Cam Henderson Center; Huntington, West Virginia
- Champions: Marshall (1st title)
- Runner-up: Green Bay (1st title game)
- Semifinalists: Hampton (1st semifinal); Texas Southern (1st semifinal)
- Winning coach: Dan D'Antoni (1st title)
- MVP: C.J. Burks (Marshall)
- Attendance: 60,058

The 2019 CollegeInsider.com Postseason Tournament (CIT) was a postseason single-elimination tournament of NCAA Division I basketball teams. The tournament began on March 18, 2019, and concluded on April 4, 2019.

This was the last CIT contested before the tournament went on a four-year hiatus. The 2020 and 2021 editions were cancelled due to the COVID-19 pandemic. In 2022, the CIT was replaced by The Basketball Classic. The Basketball Classic was not contested in 2023, and the CIT was revived in 2024.

== Participating teams ==
The following teams received an invitation to the 2019 CIT:
Note: Team records are before playing in the tournament

Team	Conference	Overall record	Conference record
Cal State Bakersfield	WAC	16–15	7–9
Cal State Fullerton	Big West	16–17	10–6
Charleston Southern	Big South	17–15	9–7
Cornell	Ivy League	15–15	7–7
Drake	Missouri Valley	24–9	12–6
East Tennessee State	Southern	24–9	13–5
Florida Atlantic	C-USA	17–15	8–10
FIU	C-USA	19–13	10–8
Grambling State	SWAC	17–16	10–8
Green Bay	Horizon	17–16	10–8
Hampton	Big South	16–17	9–7
IUPUI	Horizon	16–16	8–10
Kent State	MAC	22–10	11–7
Louisiana–Monroe	Sun Belt	18–15	9–9
Marshall	C-USA	19–14	11–7
New Orleans	Southland	19–13	12–6
NJIT	Atlantic Sun	21–12	8–8
Presbyterian	Big South	18–15	9–7
Quinnipiac	MAAC	16–14	11–7
Robert Morris	Northeast	17–16	11–7
Seattle	WAC	18–14	6–10
Southern Utah	Big Sky	16–16	9–11
St. Francis Brooklyn	Northeast	17–15	9–9
UTRGV	WAC	19–16	9–7
Texas Southern	SWAC	21–13	14–4
Texas State	Sun Belt	24–9	12–6

=== Seeds ===
The top three seeds remaining after the first round received byes to the quarterfinals. Marshall received the number 1 seed. Louisiana-Monroe and NJIT also received byes to the quarterfinals after winning their first round matchup.

=== Declined invitations ===
The following programs declined an invitation to play in the CIT.

- Bowling Green
- BYU
- Fresno State
- Hawaii
- Jacksonville State
- San Francisco
- Texas-San Antonio

== Schedule ==
Note: Top 3 seeds will get a bye after first round

Date	Time*	Matchup	Score	Attendance	Television
First round
March 18	7:00 pm	Quinnipiac at **NJIT**	81–92	777	CBS Sports Live watchcit.com
March 19	7:00 pm	Cornell at **Robert Morris**	89–98^{OT}	622	CBS Sports Live watchcit.com
March 19	7:00 pm	IUPUI at **Marshall** (Jim Phelan Classic)	73–78	3,725	CBS Sports Live watchcit.com
March 20	7:00 pm	**Green Bay** at East Tennessee State (Hugh Durham Classic)	102–94	2,817	CBS Sports Live watchcit.com
March 20	8:00 pm	**Texas Southern** at New Orleans	95–89^{OT}	612	CBS Sports Live watchcit.com
March 20	8:00 pm	Grambling State at **UTRGV**	73–74	2,071	CBS Sports Live watchcit.com
March 20	10:00 pm	**Presbyterian** at Seattle	73–68	472	CBS Sports Live watchcit.com
March 21	7:00 pm	St. Francis Brooklyn at **Hampton** (Coach John McLendon Classic)	72–81	3,124	CBS Sports Live watchcit.com
March 21	7:00 pm	Florida Atlantic at **Charleston Southern**	66–68	696	CBS Sports Live watchcit.com
March 21	8:00 pm	Kent State at **Louisiana–Monroe** (Lou Henson Classic)	77–87	5,742	CBS Sports Live watchcit.com
March 21	10:00 pm	**Cal State Bakersfield** at Cal State Fullerton (Riley Wallace Classic)	66–58	677	CBS Sports Live watchcit.com
March 22	8:30 pm	Drake at **Southern Utah**	73–80^{OT}	2,714	CBS Sports Live watchcit.com
March 23	7:00 pm	**FIU** at Texas State	87–81	1,237	CBS Sports Live watchcit.com
Second round
March 24	1:00 pm	**Presbyterian** at Robert Morris	77–70	541	CBS Sports Live watchcit.com
March 25	8:00 pm	**Texas Southern** at UTRGV	94–85	2,216	CBS Sports Live watchcit.com
March 25	8:30 pm	**Cal State Bakersfield** at Southern Utah	70–67	3,027	CBS Sports Live watchcit.com
March 26	7:00 pm	Charleston Southern at **Hampton**	67–73	3,523	CBS Sports Live watchcit.com
March 26	8:00 pm	FIU at **Green Bay**	68–98	1,341	CBS Sports Live watchcit.com
Quarterfinals
March 26	7:00 pm	Presbyterian at **Marshall**	66–83	3,383	CBS Sports Live watchcit.com
March 28	7:00 pm	**Hampton** at NJIT	82–70	776	CBS Sports Live watchcit.com
March 28	8:00 pm	**Texas Southern** at Louisiana–Monroe	108–102^{3OT}	6,004	CBS Sports Live watchcit.com
March 29	7:00 pm	Cal State Bakersfield at **Green Bay**	65–80	1,822	CBS Sports Live watchcit.com
Semifinals
April 2	7:00 pm	Hampton at **Marshall**	78–80	4,122	CBS Sports Live watchcit.com
April 2	9:00 pm	Texas Southern at **Green Bay**	86–87^{OT}	2,269	CBS Sports Live watchcit.com
Championship
April 4	7:00 pm	Green Bay at **Marshall**	70–90	5,748	CBS Sports Live
*All times are listed as Eastern Daylight Time (UTC-4). Winning team in **bold**.

== Bracket ==
Bracket is for visual purposes only. The CIT does not use a set bracket.

First round March 18–23
Texas Southern	95*
New Orleans	89
Grambling State	73
UTRGV	74
Kent State	77
Louisiana–Monroe	87
Cal State Bakersfield	66
Cal State Fullerton	58
Drake	73
Southern Utah	80*
FIU	87
Texas State	81
Green Bay	102
East Tennessee State	94
Florida Atlantic	66
Charleston Southern	68
St. Francis (NY)	72
Hampton	81
Quinnipiac	81
NJIT	92
Presbyterian	73
Seattle	68
Cornell	89
Robert Morris	98*
IUPUI	73
Marshall	78

Second round March 24–26
Texas Southern	94
UTRGV	85
Louisiana–Monroe
(bye)
Cal State Bakersfield	70
Southern Utah	67
FIU	68
Green Bay	98
Charleston Southern	67
Hampton	73
NJIT
(bye)
Presbyterian	77
Robert Morris	70
Marshall
(bye)

Quarterfinals; March 26–29
Texas Southern	108***
Louisiana–Monroe	102
Cal State Bakersfield	65
Green Bay	80
Hampton	82
NJIT	70
Presbyterian	66
Marshall	83

Semifinals; April 2
Texas Southern	86
Green Bay	87*
Hampton	78
Marshall	80

Championship; April 4
Green Bay	70
Marshall	90

Home teams listed second.
* Denotes overtime period.
