= John W. Pope Jr. Convocation Center =

Multi-purpose arena in Buies Creek, North Carolina

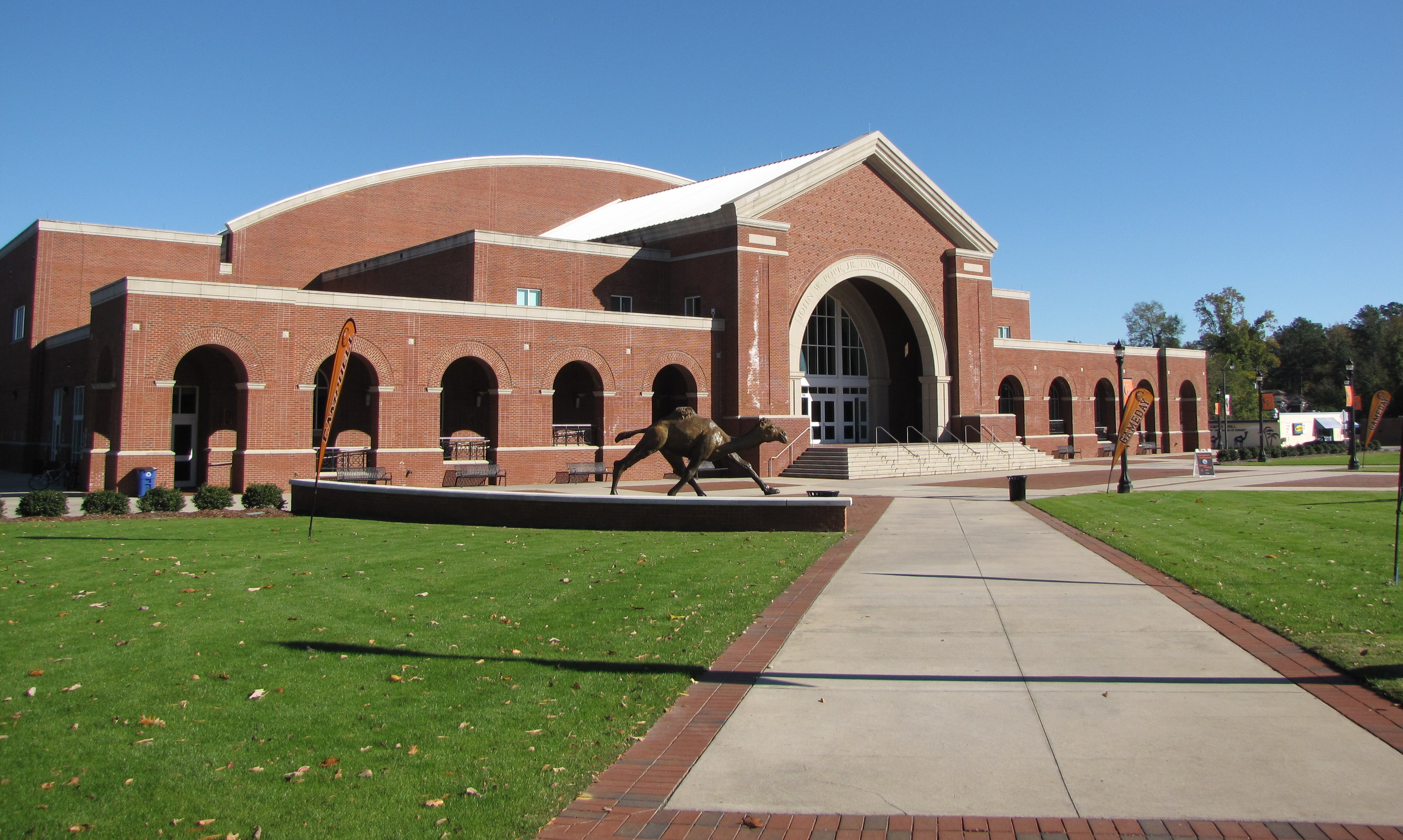
- Interactive map of John W. Pope Jr. Convocation Center
- Location: Campbell University; Buies Creek, NC 27506
- Coordinates: 35.407905°N 78.736696°W
- Owner: Campbell University
- Operator: Campbell University
- Capacity: 3,095
- Surface: Hardwood

Construction
- Groundbreaking: September 1, 2007
- Opened: October 17, 2008
- Cost: $34 million ($50.8 million in 2025 dollars)
- Architect: Little Diversified Architectural Consulting
- General contractor: T.A. Loving Company

Tenant
- Campbell Fighting Camels

The John W. Pope Jr. Convocation Center is a multi-purpose arena in Buies Creek, North Carolina. The arena, Gore Arena, is located on the campus of Campbell University and hosts the university's basketball, volleyball, and wrestling programs. It is named for Gilbert Craig Gore, the late son of a Campbell alum. The John W. Pope Jr. Convocation Center is a part of the expansion plan of Campbell's athletic facilities, which includes a new football stadium and renovations to existing Taylor Field of the baseball program. The John W. Pope Jr. Convocation Center replaced Carter Gymnasium, which was the second smallest gymnasium in Division I Basketball with just 947 seats, second only to Charleston Southern's Fieldhouse which holds 750. The John W. Pope Jr. Convocation Center also host events such as the universities commencement ceremonies and other university related events.

The Pope Convocation Center played host to the 2016 Big South Conference men's basketball tournament, taking place March 3–6 of that year. It will once again host the quarterfinal and semifinals of the conference tournament in 2019. In November 2023, the basketball court was dedicated to longtime coach and administrator Wanda Watkins.

== See also ==
- List of NCAA Division I basketball arenas
