= 2019–20 USC Upstate Spartans men's basketball team =

American college basketball season

2019–20 USC Upstate Spartans men's basketball
- Conference: Big South Conference
- Record: 13–20 (7–11 Big South)
- Head coach: Dave Dickerson (2nd season)
- Assistant coaches: Ron Bradley; Stacey Palmore; Andrew Garcia
- Home arena: G. B. Hodge Center

2019–20 Big South men's basketball standings
	Conf.				Overall
Team	W		L	PCT	W		L	PCT
Radford	15	–	3	.833	21	–	11	.656
Winthrop†	15	–	3	.833	24	–	10	.706
Gardner–Webb	11	–	7	.611	16	–	16	.500
Longwood	9	–	9	.500	14	–	18	.438
Hampton	8	–	10	.444	15	–	19	.441
UNC Asheville	8	–	10	.444	15	–	16	.484
USC Upstate	7	–	11	.389	13	–	20	.394
Charleston Southern	7	–	11	.389	14	–	18	.438
Presbyterian	7	–	11	.389	10	–	22	.313
High Point	6	–	12	.333	9	–	23	.281
Campbell	6	–	12	.333	15	–	16	.484
† 2020 Big South tournament winner

The 2019–20 USC Upstate Spartans men's basketball team represented the University of South Carolina Upstate in the 2019–20 NCAA Division I men's basketball season. The Spartans, led by second-year head coach Dave Dickerson, played their home games at the G. B. Hodge Center in Spartanburg, South Carolina as members of the Big South Conference. They finished the season 13–20, 7–11 in Big South play, to finish in a three-way tie for seventh place. They defeated High Point in the first round of the Big South tournament before losing the quarterfinals to Winthrop.

== Previous season ==
The Spartans finished the 2018–19 season 6–26 overall, 1–15 in Big South play, to finish in eleventh place. In the Big South tournament, they were defeated by Charleston Southern in the first round.

== Roster ==
2019–20 USC Upstate Spartans men's basketball team
Players
Coaches

Pos.	#	Name	Height	Weight	Year	Hometown
F	0	Brandon Martin	6 ft 5 in (1.96 m)	220 lb (100 kg)	So	Miami, FL
G	1	Dalvin White	5 ft 10 in (1.78 m)	170 lb (77 kg)	So	Norcross, GA
G	2	Cartier Jernigan	6 ft 1 in (1.85 m)	180 lb (82 kg)	Fr	Charlotte, NC
G	3	Mysta Goodloe	6 ft 4 in (1.93 m)	195 lb (88 kg)	Fr	Winston-Salem, NC
F	4	Khydarius Smith	6 ft 8 in (2.03 m)	210 lb (95 kg)	Fr	Fort Mill, SC
G/F	5	Bryson Mozone	6 ft 6 in (1.98 m)	200 lb (91 kg)	So	North Augusta, SC
G	10	Tommy Bruner	6 ft 1 in (1.85 m)	175 lb (79 kg)	Fr	Columbia, SC
G	12	Everette Hammond	6 ft 3 in (1.91 m)	185 lb (84 kg)	So	Silver Spring, MD
F	22	Andrew Tate	6 ft 6 in (1.98 m)	200 lb (91 kg)	Jr	Spartanburg, SC
G	23	Thomas Booker	6 ft 2 in (1.88 m)	180 lb (82 kg)	RS So	Nashville, TN
G	24	Mykayle Carter	6 ft 5 in (1.96 m)	190 lb (86 kg)	Fr	Lauderhill, FL
F	25	Jatayveous Watson	6 ft 8 in (2.03 m)	220 lb (100 kg)	Fr	Grantville, GA
G/F	34	Josh Aldrich	6 ft 7 in (2.01 m)	205 lb (93 kg)	So	Wilmington, NC
C	35	Nevin Zink	6 ft 9 in (2.06 m)	230 lb (104 kg)	So	Newtown, CT

Head coach

- Dave Dickerson (Maryland)

Assistant coach(es)

- Ron Bradley (Eastern Nazarene)
- Stacey Palmore (Livingston)
- Andrew Garcia (Tulane)

Legend

- (C) Team captain
- (S) Suspended
- (I) Ineligible
- (W) Walk-on
- Injured
- Current redshirt

Roster
Last update: January 25, 2020

== Schedule and results ==
Date time, TV	Rank^{#}	Opponent^{#}	Result	Record	Site (attendance) city, state
Non-conference regular season
November 5, 2019*; 7:00 p.m.		at College of Charleston	W 74–55	0–1	TD Arena (4,014); Charleston, SC
November 8, 2019*; 6:00 p.m., ESPN+		Truett McConnell	W 103–62	1–1	G. B. Hodge Center (675); Spartanburg, SC
November 11, 2019*; 7:00 p.m.		at North Carolina Central	L 64–73	1–2	McDougald–McLendon Arena (973); Durham, NC
November 13, 2019*; 7:00 p.m., ACCN Extra		at Virginia Tech	L 57–80	1–3	Cassell Coliseum (8,536); Blacksburg, VA
November 18, 2019*; 7:00 p.m., ESPN+		at Akron	L 45–76	1–4	James A. Rhodes Arena (2,214); Akron, OH
November 20, 2019*; 7:00 p.m., ACCN		at No. 2 Louisville	L 50–76	1–5	KFC Yum! Center (14,410); Louisville, KY
November 23, 2019*; 2:00 p.m.		Youngstown State	L 61–66	1–6	G. B. Hodge Center (564); Spartanburg, SC
November 30, 2019*; 4:00 p.m.		at Charlotte	L 47–83	1–7	Dale F. Halton Arena (2,593); Charlotte, NC
December 3, 2019*; 6:00 p.m., ESPN+		Eastern Kentucky	W 79–67	2–7	G. B. Hodge Center (568); Spartanburg, SC
December 8, 2019*; 2:00 p.m., ESPN+		at Furman	L 72–84	2–8	Timmons Arena (1,510); Greenville, SC
December 18, 2019*; 7:00 p.m.		at South Carolina State	W 73–70	3–8	SHM Memorial Center (312); Orangeburg, SC
December 21, 2019*; 4:00 p.m., ESPN+		Bob Jones	W 92–74	4–8	G. B. Hodge Center (450); Spartanburg, SC
December 29, 2019*; 2:00 p.m., ESPN+		VMI	W 91–82	5–8	G. B. Hodge Center (459); Spartanburg, SC
Big South Conference regular season
January 2, 2020; 7:30 p.m., ESPN+		at Charleston Southern	L 75–89	5–9 (0–1)	CSU Field House (632); North Charleston, SC
January 4, 2020; 3:00 p.m., ESPN+		at Longwood	W 73–56	6–9 (1–1)	Willett Hall (1,117); Farmville, VA
January 8, 2020; 6:00 p.m., ESPN+		Hampton	W 83–73	7–9 (2–1)	G. B. Hodge Center (445); Spartanburg, SC
January 16, 2020; 6:00 p.m., ESPN+		Radford	L 59–63	7–10 (2–2)	G. B. Hodge Center (800); Spartanburg, SC
January 18, 2020; 4:30 p.m., ESPN+		at Gardner–Webb	L 67–83	7–11 (2–3)	Paul Porter Arena (1,257); Boiling Springs, NC
January 20, 2020; 6:00 p.m., ESPN+		High Point	L 62–70	7–12 (2–4)	G. B. Hodge Center (535); Spartanburg, SC
January 23, 2020; 7:00 p.m., ESPN+		at Winthrop	L 53–79	7–13 (2–5)	Winthrop Coliseum (2,034); Rock Hill, SC
January 25, 2020; 4:00 p.m., ESPN+		UNC Asheville	W 80–63	8–13 (3–5)	G. B. Hodge Center (579); Spartanburg, SC
January 30, 2020; 7:00 p.m., ESPNU		at Presbyterian	W 77–74	9–13 (4–5)	Templeton Physical Education Center (889); Clinton, SC
February 1, 2020; 4:30 p.m., ESPN3		Campbell	W 91–74	10–13 (5–5)	G. B. Hodge Center (833); Spartanburg, SC
February 6, 2020; 6:00 p.m., ESPN+		at UNC Asheville	L 71–84	10–14 (5–6)	Kimmel Arena (1,234); Asheville, NC
February 8, 2020; 4:30 p.m., ESPN+		Gardner–Webb	L 57–88	10–15 (5–7)	G. B. Hodge Center (815); Spartanburg, SC
February 10, 2020; 6:00 p.m., ESPN+		Charleston Southern	W 66–52	11–15 (6–7)	G. B. Hodge Center (745); Spartanburg, SC
February 15, 2020; 7:00 p.m., ESPN+		at High Point	L 54–62	11–16 (6–8)	Millis Athletic Convocation Center (1,638); High Point, NC
February 20, 2020; 6:00 p.m., ESPN+		Longwood	L 58–68	11–17 (6–9)	G. B. Hodge Center (565); Spartanburg, SC
February 22, 2020; 4:30 p.m., ESPN+		at Radford	L 60–81	11–18 (6–10)	Dedmon Center (2,010); Radford, VA
February 27, 2020; 6:00 p.m., ESPN+		Winthrop	L 82–90	11–19 (6–11)	G. B. Hodge Center (833); Spartanburg, SC
February 29, 2020; 7:00 p.m., ESPN+		at Hampton	W 90–79	12–19 (7–11)	Hampton Convocation Center (4,215); Hampton, VA
Big South tournament
March 3, 2020; 7:00 p.m., ESPN3	(7)	(10) High Point; First round	W 69–59	13–19	G. B. Hodge Center (765); Spartanburg, SC
March 5, 2020; 12:00 p.m., ESPN3	(7)	vs. (2) Winthrop; Quarterfinals	L 70–106	13–20	Dedmon Center (1,052); Radford, VA
*Non-conference game. ^{#}Rankings from AP poll. (#) Tournament seedings in parentheses. All times are in Eastern.
