= 2019–20 Campbell Fighting Camels men's basketball team =

American college basketball season

2019–20 Campbell Fighting Camels men's basketball
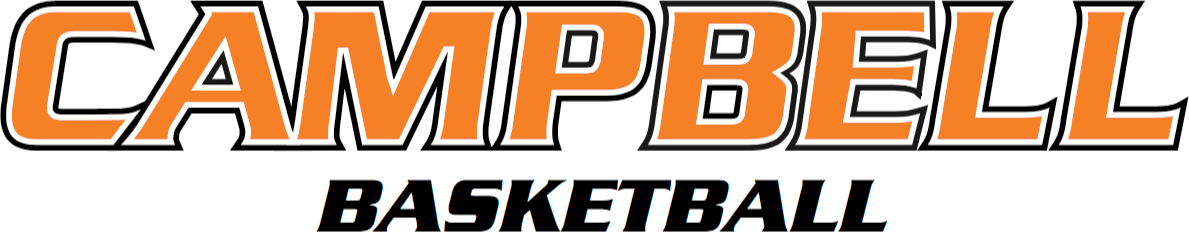
- Conference: Big South Conference
- Record: 15–16 (6–12 Big South)
- Head coach: Kevin McGeehan (7th season)
- Assistant coaches: Peter Thomas; Kevin Smith; Kenneth White
- Home arena: Gore Arena

2019–20 Big South men's basketball standings
| | Conf. | | | | Overall |
| Team | W | | L | PCT | W | | L | PCT |
|---|---|---|---|---|---|---|---|---|
| Radford | 15 | – | 3 | .833 | 21 | – | 11 | .656 |
| Winthrop† | 15 | – | 3 | .833 | 24 | – | 10 | .706 |
| Gardner–Webb | 11 | – | 7 | .611 | 16 | – | 16 | .500 |
| Longwood | 9 | – | 9 | .500 | 14 | – | 18 | .438 |
| Hampton | 8 | – | 10 | .444 | 15 | – | 19 | .441 |
| UNC Asheville | 8 | – | 10 | .444 | 15 | – | 16 | .484 |
| USC Upstate | 7 | – | 11 | .389 | 13 | – | 20 | .394 |
| Charleston Southern | 7 | – | 11 | .389 | 14 | – | 18 | .438 |
| Presbyterian | 7 | – | 11 | .389 | 10 | – | 22 | .313 |
| High Point | 6 | – | 12 | .333 | 9 | – | 23 | .281 |
| Campbell | 6 | – | 12 | .333 | 15 | – | 16 | .484 |
† 2020 Big South tournament winner

The 2019–20 Campbell Fighting Camels men's basketball team represented Campbell University in the 2019–20 NCAA Division I men's basketball season. The Fighting Camels, led by seventh-year head coach Kevin McGeehan, played their home games at Gore Arena in Buies Creek, North Carolina as members of the Big South Conference. They finished the season 15–16, 6–12 in Big South play to finish in a tie for tenth place. They lost in the first round of the Big South tournament to UNC Asheville.

== Previous season ==
The Fighting Camels finished the 2018–19 season 20–13 overall, 12–4 in Big South play to finish as regular season co-champions, alongside Radford. In the Big South tournament, they defeated Hampton in the quarterfinals, before being upset by Gardner–Webb in the semifinals. As a regular season league champion who failed to win their conference tournament, they received an automatic bid to the NIT, where they were defeated by UNC Greensboro in the first round.

== Roster ==
2019–20 Campbell Fighting Camels men's basketball team
Players
Coaches

| Pos. | # | Name | Height | Weight | Year | Hometown |
|---|---|---|---|---|---|---|
| G | 0 | Trey Spencer | 6 ft 4 in (1.93 m) | 185 lb (84 kg) | Sr | Grenada, Mississippi |
| G | 1 | Ricky Clemons | 6 ft 2 in (1.88 m) | 195 lb (88 kg) | So | Rolesville, North Carolina |
| G | 2 | Ja'Cor Nelson | 6 ft 3 in (1.91 m) | 185 lb (84 kg) | Jr | Hopkins, South Carolina |
| G/F | 4 | Noah Saunders | 6 ft 6 in (1.98 m) | 195 lb (88 kg) | Sr | Pittsburgh, Pennsylvania |
| G | 5 | Messiah Thompson | 5 ft 8 in (1.73 m) | 160 lb (73 kg) | Fr | Atlanta, Georgia |
| F | 10 | Miloš Stajčić | 6 ft 10 in (2.08 m) | 240 lb (109 kg) | So | Belgrade, Serbia |
| G | 11 | Jordan Whitfield | 6 ft 1 in (1.85 m) | 175 lb (79 kg) | Jr | Raleigh, North Carolina |
| F | 12 | Jesús Carralero | 6 ft 8 in (2.03 m) | 210 lb (95 kg) | Fr | Málaga, Spain |
| G | 13 | Austin McCullough | 6 ft 5 in (1.96 m) | 210 lb (95 kg) | Jr | Birmingham, Alabama |
| G/F | 15 | LaDarius Knight | 6 ft 5 in (1.96 m) | 195 lb (88 kg) | RS Fr | Ashford, Alabama |
| G | 20 | Dan Gross | 6 ft 2 in (1.88 m) | 195 lb (88 kg) | So | High Point, North Carolina |
| F | 21 | Duane Moss | 6 ft 6 in (1.98 m) | 200 lb (91 kg) | RS So | Myrtle Beach, South Carolina |
| G | 22 | Cory Gensler | 6 ft 4 in (1.93 m) | 205 lb (93 kg) | Sr | Cary, North Carolina |
| F | 23 | Joshua Lusane | 6 ft 7 in (2.01 m) | 220 lb (100 kg) | Fr | Americus, Georgia |
| G | 24 | Andrew Carroll | 6 ft 3 in (1.91 m) | 195 lb (88 kg) | So | Raleigh, North Carolina |
| G/F | 45 | Cedric Henderson Jr. | 6 ft 6 in (1.98 m) | 190 lb (86 kg) | So | Memphis, Tennessee |

Head coach

- Kevin McGeehan (Gettysburg)

Assistant coach(es)

- Peter Thomas (Richmond)
- Kevin Smith (Richmond)
- Kenneth White (North Carolina)

Legend

- (C) Team captain
- (S) Suspended
- (I) Ineligible
- (W) Walk-on
- Injured
- Current redshirt

Roster
Last update: September 24, 2019

== Schedule and results ==
| Date time, TV | Rank^{#} | Opponent^{#} | Result | Record | Site (attendance) city, state |
Exhibition
| October 18, 2019*; 7:00 pm | | Tuskegee | W 86–57 | | Gore Arena; Buies Creek, NC |
Non-conference regular season
| November 5, 2019*; 7:00 pm, ESPN+ | | at Coastal Carolina | L 74–75 | 1–0 | HTC Center (1,776); Conway, SC |
| November 8, 2019*; 7:30 pm, ESPN+ | | Central Penn | W 101–47 | 2–0 | Gore Arena (1,220); Buies Creek, NC |
| November 12, 2019*; 7:00 pm, FloHoops | | at UNC Wilmington | L 76–81 ^{OT} | 2–1 | Trask Coliseum (3,107); Wilmington, NC |
| November 16, 2019*; 1:00 pm, ESPN3 | | at The Citadel | W 87-73 | 3–1 | McAlister Field House (633); Charleston, SC |
| November 25, 2019*; 6:00 pm, ESPN+ | | Jacksonville | W 62–57 | 4–1 | Gore Arena (1,487); Buies Creek, NC |
| November 29, 2019*; 5:00 pm | | vs. Georgia Southern; FGCU Classic | L 74–84 | 4–2 | Alico Arena (277); Fort Myers, FL |
| November 30, 2019*; 7:30 pm, ESPN+ | | at Florida Gulf Coast; FGCU Classic | W 51–46 | 5–2 | Alico Arena (2,119); Fort Myers, FL |
| December 1, 2019*; 12:00 pm | | vs. North Dakota; FGCU Classic | W 58–56 | 6–2 | Alico Arena (103); Fort Myers, FL |
| December 14, 2019*; 4:00 pm, ESPN3 | | at East Carolina | L 67–79 | 6–3 | Williams Arena (3,234); Greenville, NC |
| December 17, 2019*; 7:00 pm, ESPN+ | | Elon | W 60–46 | 7–3 | Gore Arena (1,178); Buies Creek, NC |
| December 21, 2019*; 1:00 pm, ESPN+ | | Johnson & Wales (NC) | W 82–59 | 8–3 | Gore Arena (1,124); Buies Creek, NC |
| December 29, 2019* | | at Ohio | W 63–55 | 9–3 | Convocation Center (3,305); Athens, OH |
Big South Conference regular season
| January 2, 2020; 7:00 pm, ESPN+ | | Gardner–Webb | W 67-65 | 9–4 (0–1) | Gore Arena (1,371); Buies Creek, NC |
| January 4, 2020; 2:00 pm, ESPN+ | | Winthrop | L 72–87 | 9–5 (0–2) | Gore Arena (1,539); Buies Creek, NC |
| January 8, 2020; 6:00 pm, ESPN+ | | at UNC Asheville | W 64–62 | 10–5 (1–2) | Kimmel Arena (1,195); Asheville, NC |
| January 11, 2020; 2:00 pm, ESPN+ | | at Radford | L 63–68 | 10–6 (1–3) | Dedmon Center (1,316); Radford, VA |
| January 16, 2020; 7:00 pm, ESPNU | | Charleston Southern | L 62–77 | 10–7 (1–4) | Gore Arena (1,887); Buies Creek, NC |
| January 18, 2020; 2:00 pm, ESPN+ | | Longwood | W 68–58 | 11–7 (2–4) | Gore Arena (1,475); Buies Creek, NC |
| January 20, 2020; 7:00 pm, ESPN+ | | at Presbyterian | L 79–85 | 11–8 (2–5) | Templeton Physical Education Center (402); Clinton, SC |
| January 23, 2020; 7:00 pm, ESPN+ | | at Hampton | L 74–83 | 11–9 (2–6) | Hampton Convocation Center (3,540); Hampton, VA |
| January 30, 2020; 7:00 pm, ESPN+ | | High Point | L 57–62 | 11–10 (2–7) | Gore Arena (2,137); Buies Creek, NC |
| February 1, 2020; 4:30 pm, ESPN3 | | at USC Upstate | L 74–91 | 11–11 (2–8) | G. B. Hodge Center (833); Spartanburg, SC |
| February 6, 2020; 7:00 pm, ESPNU | | at Winthrop | L 53–62 | 11–12 (2–9) | Winthrop Coliseum (1,910); Rock Hill, SC |
| February 8, 2020; 4:30 pm, ESPN+ | | Presbyterian | W 79–62 | 12–12 (3–9) | Gore Arena (1,993); Buies Creek, NC |
| February 10, 2020; 7:00 pm, ESPN+ | | at Longwood | L 56–57 | 12–13 (3–10) | Willett Hall (1,024); Farmville, VA |
| February 13, 2020; 7:00 pm, ESPN+ | | Hampton | W 75–49 | 13–13 (4–10) | Gore Arena (1,655); Buies Creek, NC |
| February 15, 2020; 4:30 pm, ESPN+ | | Radford | L 60–73 | 13–14 (4–11) | Gore Arena (2,346); Buies Creek, NC |
| February 20, 2020; 7:30 pm, ESPN+ | | at Charleston Southern | W 66–51 | 14–14 (5–11) | CSU Field House (715); North Charleston, SC |
| February 22, 2020; 5:00 pm, ESPN+ | | at Gardner–Webb | L 61–73 | 14–15 (5–12) | Paul Porter Arena (1,121); Boiling Springs, NC |
| February 29, 2020; 4:30 pm, ESPN3 | | UNC Asheville | W 78–69 | 15–15 (6–12) | Gore Arena (1,818); Buies Creek, NC |
Big South tournament
| March 3, 2020; 7:00 pm, ESPN3 | (11) | at (6) UNC Asheville; First round | L 68–72 | 15–16 | Kimmel Arena (901); Asheville, NC |
*Non-conference game. ^{#}Rankings from AP Poll. (#) Tournament seedings in parentheses. All times are in Eastern.
