= 2019–20 Hampton Pirates basketball team =

American college basketball season

2019–20 Hampton Pirates men's basketball
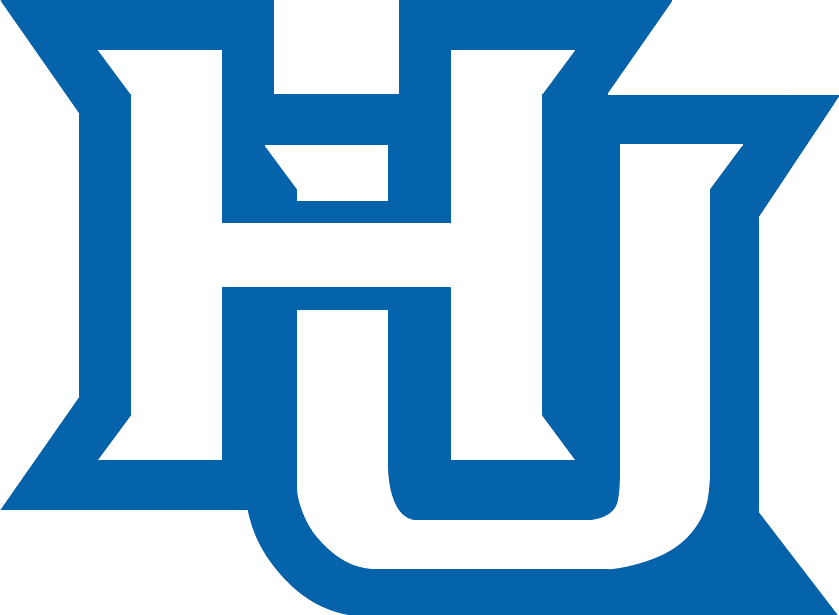
- Conference: Big South Conference
- Record: 15–19 (8–10 Big South)
- Head coach: Edward Joyner Jr. (11th season)
- Associate head coach: Darryl Sharp
- Assistant coaches: Matthew Hamilton; Jamal Robinson
- Home arena: Hampton Convocation Center

2019–20 Big South men's basketball standings
	Conf.				Overall
Team	W		L	PCT	W		L	PCT
Radford	15	–	3	.833	21	–	11	.656
Winthrop†	15	–	3	.833	24	–	10	.706
Gardner–Webb	11	–	7	.611	16	–	16	.500
Longwood	9	–	9	.500	14	–	18	.438
Hampton	8	–	10	.444	15	–	19	.441
UNC Asheville	8	–	10	.444	15	–	16	.484
USC Upstate	7	–	11	.389	13	–	20	.394
Charleston Southern	7	–	11	.389	14	–	18	.438
Presbyterian	7	–	11	.389	10	–	22	.313
High Point	6	–	12	.333	9	–	23	.281
Campbell	6	–	12	.333	15	–	16	.484
† 2020 Big South tournament winner

The 2019–20 Hampton Pirates men's basketball team represented Hampton University in the 2019–20 NCAA Division I men's basketball season. The Pirates, led by 11th-year head coach Edward Joyner Jr., played their home games at the Hampton Convocation Center in Hampton, Virginia as members of the Big South Conference. They finished the season 15–19, 8–10 in Big South play, to finish in a tie for fifth place. They defeated Longwood and Radford to advance to the championship game of the Big South tournament where they lost to Winthrop.

== Previous season ==
The Pirates finished the 2018–19 season 18–17 overall, 9–7 in Big South play, to finish in a four-way tie for fifth place. In the Big South tournament, they defeated Longwood in the first round before falling to Campbell in the quarterfinals. They received an invitation to the CIT, they defeated St. Francis Brooklyn in the first round, Charleston Southern in the second round and NJIT in the quarterfinals, before falling to Marshall in the semifinals.

== Roster ==
2019–20 Hampton Pirates men's basketball team
Players
Coaches

Pos.	#	Name	Height	Weight	Year	Hometown
G	1	Russell Dean	6 ft 4 in (1.93 m)	200 lb (91 kg)	Fr	Columbia, SC
G	2	Jermaine Marrow	6 ft 0 in (1.83 m)	182 lb (83 kg)	Sr	Newport News, VA
G	3	Davion Warren	6 ft 6 in (1.98 m)	210 lb (95 kg)	Jr	Buffalo, NY
G	4	Greg Heckstall	6 ft 8 in (2.03 m)	195 lb (88 kg)	Sr	Norfolk, VA
C	5	Pierre Sow	7 ft 0 in (2.13 m)	215 lb (98 kg)	So	Teaneck, NJ
G	11	Dondre Griffin	6 ft 3 in (1.91 m)	200 lb (91 kg)	Sr	Raleigh, NC
G	12	Chris Shelton	6 ft 4 in (1.93 m)	190 lb (86 kg)	Fr	Louisa, VA
F	13	Edward Oliver-Hampton	6 ft 7 in (2.01 m)	190 lb (86 kg)	Jr	Prince George's County, MD
F	14	Ben Stanley	6 ft 6 in (1.98 m)	225 lb (102 kg)	So	Baltimore, MD
G/F	15	Saheem Anthony	6 ft 7 in (2.01 m)	200 lb (91 kg)	Jr	Brooklyn, NY
F	21	Amir Smith	6 ft 6 in (1.98 m)	220 lb (100 kg)	GS	Houston, TX
G/F	22	Trey Carver	6 ft 5 in (1.96 m)	230 lb (104 kg)	Sr	Elizabeth City, NC
G/F	23	Daniel Banister	6 ft 5 in (1.96 m)	190 lb (86 kg)	Fr	Chesapeake, VA
G	24	RJ Forbes	6 ft 3 in (1.91 m)	205 lb (93 kg)	Fr	Bowie, MD
G	25	Bryce Earle	6 ft 0 in (1.83 m)	—	Fr	Columbia, SC
G	33	Toure Banks	6 ft 5 in (1.96 m)	190 lb (86 kg)	Fr	Philadelphia, PA

Head coach

- Edward Joyner Jr. (Hampton)

Assistant coach(es)

- Darryl Sharp (Bloomsburg)
- Matthew Hamilton (Appalachian State)
- Jamal Robinson (Virginia)

Legend

- (C) Team captain
- (S) Suspended
- (I) Ineligible
- (W) Walk-on
- Injured
- Current redshirt

Roster
Last update: January 24, 2020

== Schedule and results ==
Date time, TV	Rank^{#}	Opponent^{#}	Result	Record	Site (attendance) city, state
Non-conference regular season
November 6, 2019*; 7:00 p.m., ESPN+		Mid-Atlantic Christian	W 112–52	1–0	Hampton Convocation Center (3,123); Hampton, VA
November 12, 2019*; 7:00 p.m., ESPN+		Newport News Apprentice	W 95–63	2–0	Hampton Convocation Center (3,522); Hampton, VA
November 15, 2019*; 7:00 p.m.		at William & Mary	L 65–78	2–1	Kaplan Arena (3,735); Williamsburg, VA
November 21, 2019*; 7:00 p.m., ESPN+		Regent	W 93–50	3–1	Hampton Convocation Center (2,523); Hampton, VA
November 23, 2019*; 8:00 p.m., BTN+		at Illinois	L 71–120	3–2	State Farm Center (9,732); Champaign, IL
November 26, 2019*; 3:00 p.m.		at San Francisco	L 73–89	3–3	War Memorial Gymnasium (1,211); San Francisco, CA
November 29, 2019*; 10:00 p.m., ESPN+		at Cal State Bakersfield	L 57–70	3–4	Icardo Center (1,668); Bakersfield, CA
December 3, 2019*; 7:00 p.m., ESPN+		Richmond	L 63–80	3–5	Hampton Convocation Center (3,323); Hampton, VA
December 5, 2019*; 7:00 p.m., ESPN+		Howard	L 91–94 ^{OT}	3–6	Hampton Convocation Center (4,512); Hampton, VA
December 7, 2019*; 6:00 p.m., ESPN+		Norfolk State	W 64–53	4–6	Hampton Convocation Center (7,123); Hampton, VA
December 18, 2019*; 8:00 p.m., ESPN+		at Southern Illinois	L 53–75	4–7	Banterra Center (3,519); Carbondale, IL
December 21, 2019*; 7:00 p.m., ESPN3		at Kent State	L 64–103	4–8	MAC Center (1,937); Kent, OH
December 28, 2019*; 1:00 p.m., ESPN+		Saint Peter's	W 70–67	5–8	Hampton Convocation Center (2,525); Hampton, VA
Big South Conference regular season
January 4, 2020; 6:00 p.m., ESPN+		Charleston Southern	W 92–85	6–8 (1–0)	Hampton Convocation Center (3,123); Hampton, VA
January 8, 2020; 6:00 p.m., ESPN+		at USC Upstate	L 73–83	6–9 (1–1)	G. B. Hodge Center (445); Spartanburg, SC
January 11, 2020; 6:00 p.m., ESPN+		Longwood	W 83–80	7–9 (2–1)	Hampton Convocation Center (3,565); Hampton, VA
January 16, 2020; 7:00 p.m., ESPN+		Winthrop	L 95–116	7–10 (2–2)	Hampton Convocation Center (3,123); Hampton, VA
January 18, 2020; 2:00 p.m., ESPN+		at UNC Asheville	W 88–86	8–10 (3–2)	Kimmel Arena (1,912); Asheville, NC
January 20, 2020; 7:00 p.m., ESPN+		at Gardner–Webb; Suspended at halftime due to shot clock malfunction Makeup date of Feb. 24	Suspended; 31–39 halftime		Paul Porter Arena; Boiling Springs, NC
January 23, 2020; 7:00 p.m., ESPN+		Campbell	W 83–74	9–10 (4–2)	Hampton Convocation Center (3,540); Hampton, VA
January 25, 2020; 4:00 p.m., ESPN3		at Radford	L 79–83	9–11 (4–3)	Dedmon Center (1,690); Radford, VA
February 1, 2020; 4:00 p.m., ESPN+		Presbyterian	W 87–81 ^{OT}	10–11 (5–3)	Hampton Convocation Center (4,124); Hampton, VA
February 6, 2020; 7:00 p.m., ESPN+		at High Point	L 85–88	10–12 (5–4)	Millis Center (811); High Point, NC
February 8, 2020; 5:30 p.m., ESPN+		at Charleston Southern	L 72–85	10–13 (5–5)	CSU Field House (736); North Charleston, SC
February 10, 2020; 7:00 p.m., ESPN+		UNC Asheville	W 80–70	11–13 (6–5)	Hampton Convocation Center (3,123); Hampton, VA
February 13, 2020; 7:00 p.m., ESPN+		at Campbell	L 49–75	11–14 (6–6)	Gore Arena (1,655); Buies Creek, NC
February 15, 2020; 6:00 p.m., ESPN3		at Longwood	L 68–76	11–15 (6–7)	Willett Hall (1,415); Farmville, VA
February 20, 2020; 7:00 p.m., ESPN+		Gardner–Webb	W 87–77	12–15 (7–7)	Hampton Convocation Center (2,551); Hampton, VA
February 22, 2020; 1:00 p.m., ESPN+		at Winthrop	W 87–81	13–15 (8–7)	Winthrop Coliseum (3,493); Rock Hill, SC
February 24, 2020; 7:00 p.m., ESPN+		at Gardner–Webb; Resuming suspended game from Jan. 20	L 67–81	13–16 (8–8)	Paul Porter Arena (988); Boiling Springs, NC
February 27, 2020; 7:00 p.m.		Radford	L 78–81	13–17 (8–9)	Hampton Convocation Center (6,213); Hampton, VA
February 29, 2020; 4:30 p.m., ESPN+		USC Upstate	L 79–90	13–18 (8–10)	Hampton Convocation Center (4,215); Hampton, VA
Big South tournament
March 5, 2020; 8:00 p.m., ESPN3	(5)	vs. (4) Longwood; Quarterfinals	W 78–53	14–18	Dedmon Center (2,222); Radford, VA
March 6, 2020; 8:00 p.m., ESPN+	(5)	at (1) Radford; Semifinals	W 86–78	15–18	Dedmon Center; Radford, VA
March 8, 2020; 1:00 p.m., ESPN	(5)	at (2) Winthrop; Championship	L 68–76	15–19	Winthop Coliseum (4,866); Rock Hill, SC
*Non-conference game. ^{#}Rankings from AP poll. (#) Tournament seedings in parentheses. All times are in Eastern.
