= 2019–20 Gardner–Webb Runnin' Bulldogs men's basketball team =

American college basketball season

2019–20 Gardner–Webb Runnin' Bulldogs men's basketball
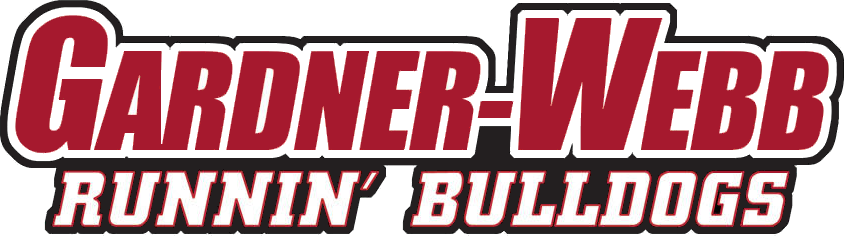

Cancún Challenge Mayan Division champions
- Conference: Big South Conference
- Record: 16–16 (11–7 Big South)
- Head coach: Tim Craft (7th season)
- Assistant coaches: Jeremy Luther; Jake DeLaney
- Home arena: Paul Porter Arena

2019–20 Big South men's basketball standings
	Conf.				Overall
Team	W		L	PCT	W		L	PCT
Radford	15	–	3	.833	21	–	11	.656
Winthrop†	15	–	3	.833	24	–	10	.706
Gardner–Webb	11	–	7	.611	16	–	16	.500
Longwood	9	–	9	.500	14	–	18	.438
Hampton	8	–	10	.444	15	–	19	.441
UNC Asheville	8	–	10	.444	15	–	16	.484
USC Upstate	7	–	11	.389	13	–	20	.394
Charleston Southern	7	–	11	.389	14	–	18	.438
Presbyterian	7	–	11	.389	10	–	22	.313
High Point	6	–	12	.333	9	–	23	.281
Campbell	6	–	12	.333	15	–	16	.484
† 2020 Big South tournament winner

The 2019–20 Gardner–Webb Runnin' Bulldogs men's basketball team represented Gardner–Webb University in the 2019–20 NCAA Division I men's basketball season. The Runnin' Bulldogs, led by seventh-year head coach Tim Craft, played their home games at the Paul Porter Arena in Boiling Springs, North Carolina as members of the Big South Conference. They finished the season 16–16, 11–7 in Big South play to finish in third place. They defeated UNC Asheville in the quarterfinals of the Big South tournament before losing in the semifinals to Winthrop.

== Previous season ==
The Runnin' Bulldogs finished the 2018–19 season 23–12 overall, 10–6 in Big South play to finish in a tie for second place. In the Big South tournament, they defeated High Point in the first round, upset top-seeded Campbell in the quarterfinals, to advance to the championship game, where they faced Radford, ultimately winning the game, marking Gardner–Webb's first ever appearance in the NCAA Tournament in school history. They received the Big South's automatic bid to the NCAA tournament, where they were defeated in the first round by Virginia.

== Roster ==
2019–20 Gardner–Webb Runnin' Bulldogs men's basketball team
Players
Coaches

Pos.	#	Name	Height	Weight	Year	Hometown
G	0	Lance Terry	6 ft 2 in (1.88 m)	180 lb (82 kg)	Fr	Newnan, Georgia
PG	1	Jaheam Cornwall	6 ft 0 in (1.83 m)	175 lb (79 kg)	Jr	Brooklyn, New York
F	2	Eric Jamison, Jr.	6 ft 6 in (1.98 m)	195 lb (88 kg)	Sr	East Point, Georgia
G	3	Justin Jenkins	6 ft 2 in (1.88 m)	200 lb (91 kg)	Sr	Knoxville, Tennessee
G	4	Christian Turner	5 ft 10 in (1.78 m)	180 lb (82 kg)	Sr	Atlanta, Georgia
G/F	5	Jose Perez	6 ft 6 in (1.98 m)	200 lb (91 kg)	So	Bronx, New York
G	10	Nate Johnson	6 ft 3 in (1.91 m)	180 lb (82 kg)	Jr	Miami, Florida
G	11	Mick Lynott	6 ft 2 in (1.88 m)	190 lb (86 kg)	Fr	Miami, Florida
F	14	Kareem Reid	6 ft 9 in (2.06 m)	205 lb (93 kg)	Fr	Queens, New York
G	21	Kennedy Kincaid	5 ft 10 in (1.78 m)	170 lb (77 kg)	So	Marion, North Carolina
G	23	Anthony Selden	6 ft 6 in (1.98 m)	220 lb (100 kg)	Fr	Boston, Massachusetts
F	24	Ludovic Dufeal	6 ft 8 in (2.03 m)	200 lb (91 kg)	So	Saint-Joseph, Martinique
C	25	Sammy Itodo	6 ft 8 in (2.03 m)	210 lb (95 kg)	Fr	Kaduna, Nigeria
C	32	Gabe Bryant	6 ft 9 in (2.06 m)	250 lb (113 kg)	Fr	Spartanburg, South Carolina
G	35	Delis Boggs	5 ft 11 in (1.8 m)	180 lb (82 kg)	Fr	Greenville, South Carolina

Head coach

- Tim Craft (Florida)

Assistant coach(es)

- Jeremy Luther (North Greenville)
- Jake DeLaney (Gardner–Webb)

Legend

- (C) Team captain
- (S) Suspended
- (I) Ineligible
- (W) Walk-on
- Injured
- Current redshirt

Roster
Last update: January 24, 2020

== Schedule and results ==
Date time, TV	Rank^{#}	Opponent^{#}	Result	Record	Site (attendance) city, state
Non-conference regular season
November 5, 2019*; 7:00 pm, ESPN+		Furman	L 63–70	0–1	Paul Porter Arena (2,475); Boiling Springs, NC
November 9, 2019*; 12:00 pm, ESPN3		at Western Carolina	L 59–71	0–2	Ramsey Center (1,735); Cullowhee, NC
November 15, 2019*; 9:00 pm, ACCN		at No. 6 North Carolina	L 61–77	0–3	Dean Smith Center (20,374); Chapel Hill, NC
November 19, 2019*; 8:00 pm		at Wichita State; Cancún Challenge campus game	L 52–74	0–4	Charles Koch Arena (10,004); Wichita, KS
November 22, 2019*; 7:00 pm, SECN+		at South Carolina; Cancún Challenge campus game	L 69–74	0–5	Colonial Life Arena (10,022); Columbia, SC
November 26, 2019*; 12:30 pm		vs. UT Martin; Cancún Challenge Mayan Division semifinals	W 81–64	1–5	Hard Rock Hotel Riviera Convention Center (253); Cancún, Mexico
November 27, 2019*; 3:00 pm		vs. Northern Colorado; Cancún Challenge Mayan Division	W 67–62	2–5	Hard Rock Hotel Riviera Convention Center (107); Cancún, Mexico
December 3, 2019*; 7:00 pm, ESPN+		Coker	W 73–59	3–5	Paul Porter Arena (970); Boiling Springs, NC
December 7, 2019*; 7:00 pm, ESPN3		at Wofford	L 77–81	3–6	Jerry Richardson Indoor Stadium (1,389); Spartanburg, SC
December 13, 2019*; 7:00 pm, ESPN+		at Kennesaw State	L 61–85	3–7	KSU Convocation Center (953); Kennesaw, GA
December 15, 2019*; 1:30 pm, ACCN Extra		at Virginia Tech	L 46–73	3–8	Cassell Coliseum (9,275); Blacksburg, VA
December 19, 2019*; 11:00 am, ESPN+		Bob Jones	W 94–70	4–8	Paul Porter Arena (2,049); Boiling Springs, NC
Big South Conference regular season
January 2, 2020; 7:00 pm, ESPN+		at Campbell	W 67–65	5–8 (1–0)	Gore Arena (1,371); Buies Creek, NC
January 4, 2020; 3:00 pm, ESPN+		Presbyterian	L 62–68	5–9 (1–1)	Paul Porter Arena (1,253); Boiling Springs, NC
January 8, 2020; 7:00 pm, ESPN+		Radford	L 64–67	5–10 (1–2)	Paul Porter Arena (1,459); Boiling Springs, NC
January 11, 2020; 7:00 pm, ESPN+		at Winthrop	L 95–99 ^{3OT}	5–11 (1–3)	Winthrop Coliseum (2,321); Rock Hill, SC
January 18, 2020; 4:30 pm, ESPN+		USC Upstate	W 83–67	6–11 (2–3)	Paul Porter Arena (1,257); Boiling Springs, NC
January 20, 2020; 7:00 pm, ESPN+		Hampton; Suspended at Halftime due to shot clock malfunction. Makeup date 2/24/20	Suspended; 39–31 Halftime		Paul Porter Arena; Boiling Springs, NC
January 23, 2020; 7:00 pm, ESPN+		at High Point	W 79–76 ^{OT}	7–11 (3–3)	Millis Center (1,094); High Point, NC
January 25, 2020; 4:30 pm, ESPN+		Charleston Southern	L 83–92 ^{2OT}	7–12 (3–4)	Paul Porter Arena (1,432); Boiling Springs, NC
January 30, 2020; 6:00 pm, ESPN+		at UNC Asheville	W 70–56	8–12 (4–4)	Kimmel Arena (1,232); Asheville, NC
February 1, 2020; 4:30 pm, ESPN+		Longwood	L 81–84 ^{OT}	8–13 (4–5)	Paul Porter Arena (1,251); Boiling Springs, NC
February 6, 2020; 7:00 pm, ESPN+		at Presbyterian	L 61–65	8–14 (4–6)	Templeton Physical Education Center (279); Clinton, SC
February 8, 2020; 4:30 pm, ESPN+		at USC Upstate	W 88–57	9–14 (5–6)	G. B. Hodge Center (815); Spartanburg, SC
February 10, 2020; 7:00 pm, ESPN3		High Point	W 86–55	10–14 (6–6)	Paul Porter Arena (1,150); Boiling Springs, NC
February 13, 2020; 7:00 pm, ESPNU		Winthrop	W 74–70	11–14 (7–6)	Paul Porter Arena (2,351); Boiling Springs, NC
February 20, 2020; 7:00 pm, ESPN+		at Hampton	L 77–87	11–15 (7–7)	Hampton Convocation Center (2,551); Hampton, VA
February 22, 2020; 5:00 pm, ESPN+		Campbell	W 73–61	12–15 (8–7)	Paul Porter Arena (1,121); Boiling Springs, NC
February 24, 2020; 7:00 pm, ESPN+		Hampton; Resuming suspended game from 1/20/20	W 81–67	13–15 (9–7)	Paul Porter Arena (988); Boiling Springs, NC
February 27, 2020; 7:30 pm		at Charleston Southern	W 83–74	14–15 (10–7)	CSU Field House (732); North Charleston, SC
February 29, 2020; 4:00 pm, ESPN+		at Radford	W 70–62	15–15 (11–7)	Dedmon Center (2,245); Radford, VA
Big South tournament
March 5, 2020; 2:00 pm, ESPN3	(3)	vs. (6) UNC Asheville; Quarterfinals	W 72–62	16–15	Dedmon Center (1,052); Radford, VA
March 6, 2020; 6:00 pm, ESPN+	(3)	vs. (2) Winthrop; Semifinals	L 66-78	16-16	Dedmon Center; Radford, VA
*Non-conference game. ^{#}Rankings from AP Poll. (#) Tournament seedings in parentheses. All times are in Eastern.
