= 2019–20 Longwood Lancers men's basketball team =

American college basketball season

2019–20 Longwood Lancers men's basketball
- Conference: Big South Conference
- Record: 14–18 (9–9 Big South)
- Head coach: Griff Aldrich (2nd season)
- Assistant coaches: Marty McGillan (2nd season); Austin Shaver (1st season); Donovan Williams (1st season); Luke Ford (1st season); Riley McGillan (1st season)
- Home arena: Willett Hall

2019–20 Big South men's basketball standings
| | Conf. | | | | Overall |
| Team | W | | L | PCT | W | | L | PCT |
|---|---|---|---|---|---|---|---|---|
| Radford | 15 | – | 3 | .833 | 21 | – | 11 | .656 |
| Winthrop† | 15 | – | 3 | .833 | 24 | – | 10 | .706 |
| Gardner–Webb | 11 | – | 7 | .611 | 16 | – | 16 | .500 |
| Longwood | 9 | – | 9 | .500 | 14 | – | 18 | .438 |
| Hampton | 8 | – | 10 | .444 | 15 | – | 19 | .441 |
| UNC Asheville | 8 | – | 10 | .444 | 15 | – | 16 | .484 |
| USC Upstate | 7 | – | 11 | .389 | 13 | – | 20 | .394 |
| Charleston Southern | 7 | – | 11 | .389 | 14 | – | 18 | .438 |
| Presbyterian | 7 | – | 11 | .389 | 10 | – | 22 | .313 |
| High Point | 6 | – | 12 | .333 | 9 | – | 23 | .281 |
| Campbell | 6 | – | 12 | .333 | 15 | – | 16 | .484 |
† 2020 Big South tournament winner

The 2019–20 Longwood Lancers men's basketball team represented Longwood University in the 2019–20 NCAA Division I men's basketball season. The Lancers, led by second-year head coach Griff Aldrich, played their home games at Willett Hall in Farmville, Virginia as members of the Big South Conference. They finished the season 14–18, 9–9 in Big South play to finish in fourth place. They lost in the quarterfinals of the Big South tournament to Hampton.

== Previous season ==
The Lancers finished the 2018–19 season 16–18 overall, 5–11 in Big South play to finish in ninth place. In the Big South tournament, they were defeated by Hampton in the first round. The Lancers received an invitation to the CBI, where they defeated Southern Miss in the first round, before falling in the quarterfinals to DePaul.

== Roster ==
2019–20 Longwood Lancers men's basketball team
Players
Coaches

| Pos. | # | Name | Height | Weight | Year | Hometown |
|---|---|---|---|---|---|---|
| F | 0 | Leslie Nkereuwem | 6 ft 7 in (2.01 m) | 215 lb (98 kg) | Fr | Lawrenceville, Georgia |
| F | 1 | Christian Wilson | 6 ft 6 in (1.98 m) | 195 lb (88 kg) | So | Queens, New York |
| G | 2 | Nate Lliteras | 6 ft 7 in (2.01 m) | 205 lb (93 kg) | Fr | Seward, Nebraska |
| G | 3 | Shabooty Phillips | 6 ft 1 in (1.85 m) | 185 lb (84 kg) | Sr | Houston, Texas |
| G | 4 | Jaylon Wilson | 6 ft 3 in (1.91 m) | 190 lb (86 kg) | Sr | Moore, Oklahoma |
| F | 5 | Bennett Mohn | 6 ft 6 in (1.98 m) | 175 lb (79 kg) | Fr | Austin, Texas |
| F | 10 | Ilija Stefanovic | 6 ft 10 in (2.08 m) | 200 lb (91 kg) | Jr | Novi Sad, Serbia |
| G | 11 | Seán Flood | 6 ft 2 in (1.88 m) | 170 lb (77 kg) | Sr | Dublin, Ireland |
| G | 13 | Heru Bligen | 6 ft 3 in (1.91 m) | 180 lb (82 kg) | Fr | Prince George's County, Maryland |
| F | 14 | Abraham Deng | 6 ft 11 in (2.11 m) | 225 lb (102 kg) | Fr | Juba, South Sudan |
| F | 20 | Jordan Cintron | 6 ft 8 in (2.03 m) | 220 lb (100 kg) | Jr | Bronx, New York |
| F | 21 | JaShaun Smith | 6 ft 5 in (1.96 m) | 200 lb (91 kg) | Sr | Raleigh, North Carolina |
| G | 22 | DeShaun Wade | 6 ft 2 in (1.88 m) | 210 lb (95 kg) | So | Virginia Beach, Virginia |
| G | 24 | Cameron O'Conner | 6 ft 5 in (1.96 m) | 175 lb (79 kg) | Fr | Roanoke, Virginia |
| G | 55 | Juan Munoz | 5 ft 11 in (1.8 m) | 170 lb (77 kg) | RS So | Morrisville, North Carolina |

Head coach

- Griff Aldrich (Hampden–Sydney)

Assistant coach(es)

- Marty McGillan (UNC Wilmington)
- Austin Shaver (Virginia)
- Donovan Williams (Park)
- Luke Ford (Virginia)
- Riley McGillan (Clemson)

Legend

- (C) Team captain
- (S) Suspended
- (I) Ineligible
- (W) Walk-on
- Injured
- Current redshirt

Roster
Last update: September 29, 2019

== Schedule and results ==
| Date time, TV | Rank^{#} | Opponent^{#} | Result | Record | High points | High rebounds | High assists | Site (attendance) city, state |
Non-conference regular season
| November 5, 2019*; 7:00 pm, ESPN+ | | Marymount | W 73–51 | 1–0 | 12 – C. Wilson | 11 – Nkereuwem | 7 – Munoz | Willett Hall (1,214); Farmville, VA |
| November 8, 2019*; 7:00 pm, ESPN+ | | at George Mason | L 66–75 | 1–1 | 13 – Wade | 9 – Cintron | 6 – Phillips | EagleBank Arena (5,113); Fairfax, VA |
| November 12, 2019*; 7:00 pm, ESPN+ | | Maryland Eastern Shore | W 85–55 | 2–1 | 17 – C. Wilson | 5 – 2 Tied | 4 – C. Wilson | Willett Hall (1,225); Farmville, VA |
| November 14, 2019*; 7:00 pm, ESPN+ | | St. Francis Brooklyn | W 86–77 | 3–1 | 23 – Phillips | 4 – 4 Tied | 4 – Phillips | Willett Hall (1,250); Farmville, VA |
| November 15, 2019*; 7:00 pm, ESPN+ | | Randolph | W 78–53 | 4–1 | 13 – 2 Tied | 12 – Cintron | 3 – Wade | Willett Hall (1,345); Farmville, VA |
| November 18, 2019*; 7:00 pm, ESPN+ | | at Northern Illinois | L 48–65 | 4–2 | 15 – Cintron | 8 – Cintron | 3 – Phillips | Convocation Center (601); DeKalb, IL |
| November 26, 2019*; 10:00 pm, BigWest.tv | | at UC Riverside | L 58–71 | 4–3 | 12 – Wade | 12 – Wade | 4 – Wade | SRC Arena (274); Riverside, CA |
| November 29, 2019*; 10:00 pm, Stadium | | at Pacific | L 51–69 | 4–4 | 10 – Smith | 4 – Phillips | 3 – Flood | Alex G. Spanos Center (1,858); Stockton, CA |
| December 4, 2019*; 7:00 pm | | at North Carolina A&T | L 41–52 | 4–5 | 10 – Phillips | 6 – Cintron | 5 – Munoz | Corbett Sports Center (1,807); Greensboro, NC |
| December 7, 2019*; 2:00 pm | | at Morgan State | L 65–73 | 4–6 | 15 – J. Wilson | 5 – C. Wilson | 5 – Munoz | Talmadge L. Hill Field House (569); Baltimore, MD |
| December 15, 2019*; 4:00 pm, ESPN+ | | at Stetson | W 76–72 | 5–6 | 24 – Phillips | 6 – Phillips | 5 – Phillips | Edmunds Center (359); DeLand, FL |
| December 19, 2019*; 7:00 pm, ESPN+ | | The Citadel | L 99–102 ^{3OT} | 5–7 | 24 – Tied | 16 – Phillips | 6 – Munoz | Willett Hall (913); Farmville, VA |
| December 28, 2019*; 4:00 pm, ESPN+ | | at George Washington | L 65–78 | 5–8 | 17 – Smith | 7 – Phillips | 5 – Phillips | Charles E. Smith Center (1,996); Washington, D.C. |
Big South Conference regular season
| January 2, 2020; 7:00 pm, ESPN+ | | at Winthrop | L 67–91 | 5–9 (0–1) | 25 – Wilson | 8 – Smith | 3 – Wade | Winthrop Coliseum (1,325); Rock Hill, SC |
| January 4, 2020; 3:00 pm, ESPN+ | | USC Upstate | L 56–73 | 5–10 (0–2) | 14 – Munoz | 7 – Phillips | 5 – Phillips | Willett Hall (1,117); Farmville, VA |
| January 8, 2020; 7:30 pm, ESPN+ | | at Charleston Southern | W 74–56 | 6–10 (1–2) | 17 – Munoz | 7 – Munoz | 4 – Munoz | CSU Field House (417); North Charleston, SC |
| January 11, 2020; 6:00 pm, ESPN+ | | at Hampton | L 80–83 | 6–11 (1–3) | 19 – Phillips | 14 – Cintron | 5 – Phillips | Hampton Convocation Center (3,536); Hampton, VA |
| January 16, 2020; 7:00 pm, ESPN+ | | Presbyterian | L 67–74 | 6–12 (1–4) | 12 – Munoz | 8 – Hightower | 6 – Hightower | Willett Hall (1,408); Farmville, VA |
| January 18, 2020; 2:00 pm, ESPN+ | | at Campbell | L 58–68 | 6–13 (1–5) | 13 – Phillips | 10 – Cintron | 2 – Munoz | Gore Arena (1,475); Buies Creek, NC |
| January 20, 2020; 7:00 pm, ESPN+ | | UNC Asheville | L 66–71 | 6–14 (1–6) | 16 – Phillips | 9 – Cintron | 6 – Munoz | Willett Hall (1,218); Farmville, VA |
| January 25, 2020; 7:00 pm, ESPN+ | | at High Point | W 72–62 | 7–14 (2–6) | 27 – Munoz | 8 – Cintron | 3 – Munoz | Millis Center (1,408); High Point, NC |
| January 30, 2020; 7:00 pm, ESPN+ | | Radford | L 55–67 | 7–15 (2–7) | 17 – Munoz | 9 – Cintron | 3 – Tied | Willett Hall (1,613); Farmville, VA |
| February 1, 2020; 4:30 pm, ESPN+ | | at Gardner–Webb | W 84–81 ^{OT} | 8–15 (3–7) | 20 – Smith | 6 – Nkereuwem | 6 – Munoz | Paul Porter Arena (1,251); Boiling Springs, NC |
| February 6, 2020; 7:00 pm, ESPN+ | | Charleston Southern | W 71–63 | 9–15 (4–7) | 23 – Phillips | 10 – Cintron | 5 – Munoz | Willett Hall (1,351); Farmville, VA |
| February 8, 2020; 3:00 pm, ESPN+ | | Winthrop | L 68–70 | 9–16 (4–8) | 24 – Munoz | 6 – Clinton | 3 – Phillips | Willett Hall (1,528); Farmville, VA |
| February 10, 2020; 7:00 pm, ESPN+ | | Campbell | W 57–56 | 10–16 (5–8) | 9 – 4 tied | 6 – Nkereuwem | 5 – Phillips | Willett Hall (1,024); Farmville, VA |
| February 13, 2020; 7:00 pm, ESPN+ | | at UNC Asheville | L 71–73 | 10–17 (5–9) | 17 – Wilson | 8 – Nkereuwem | 8 – Phillips | Kimmel Arena (1,615); Asheville, NC |
| February 15, 2020; 6:00 pm, ESPN3 | | Hampton | W 76–68 | 11–17 (6–9) | 16 – Munoz | 12 – Cintron | 5 – Munoz | Willett Hall (1,415); Farmville, VA |
| February 20, 2020; 6:00 pm, ESPN+ | | at USC Upstate | W 68–58 | 12–17 (7–9) | 13 – 3 tied | 10 – Phillips | 4 – Tied | G. B. Hodge Center (565); Spartanburg, SC |
| February 22, 2020; 7:00 pm, ESPN+ | | High Point | W 57–54 | 13–17 (8–9) | 19 – Wade | 7 – Wade | 6 – Phillips | Willett Hall (1,672); Farmville, VA |
| February 27, 2020; 7:00 pm, ESPN+ | | at Presbyterian | W 58–55 | 14–17 (9–9) | 16 – Smith | 6 – Wade | 5 – Phillips | Templeton Physical Education Center (281); Clinton, SC |
Big South tournament
| March 5, 2020; 8:00 pm, ESPN3 | (4) | vs. (5) Hampton; Quarterfinals | L 53–78 | 14–18 | 17 – Wilson | 7 – Wade | 3 – Phillips | Dedmon Center (2,222); Radford, VA |
*Non-conference game. ^{#}Rankings from AP Poll. (#) Tournament seedings in parentheses. All times are in Eastern.
