= 2019–20 Winthrop Eagles men's basketball team =

American college basketball season

2019–20 Winthrop Eagles men's basketball
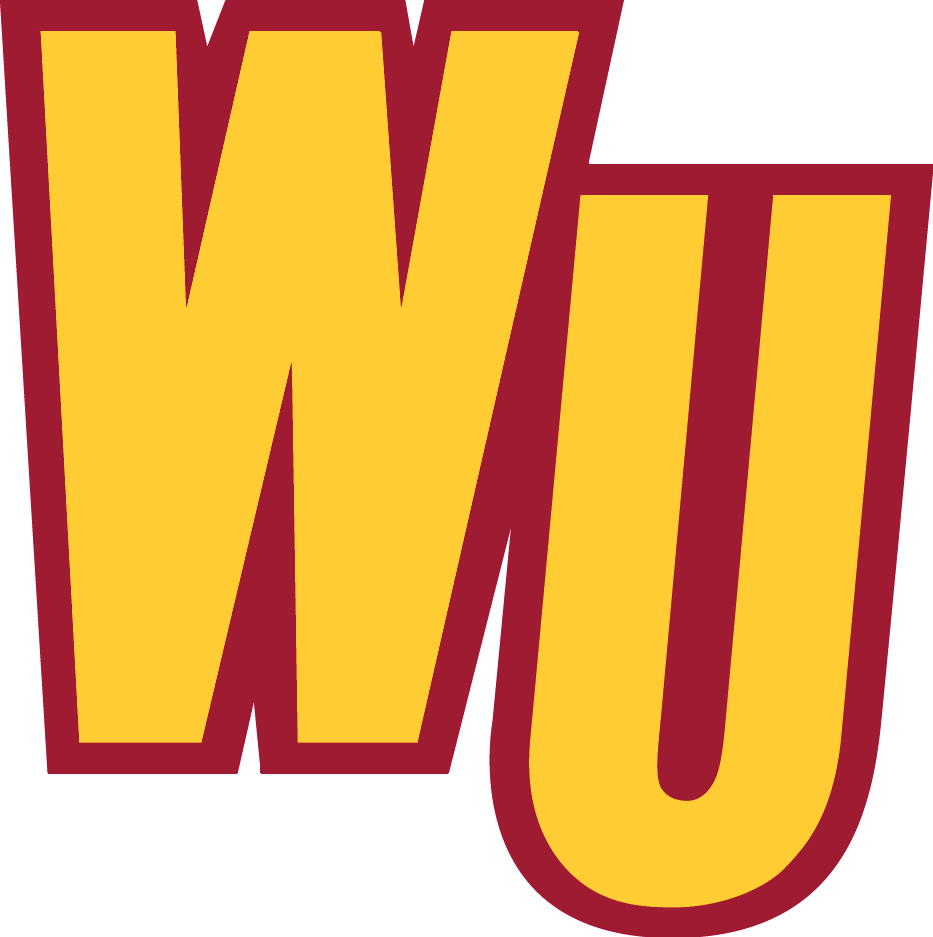

Big South regular season co-champions Big South tournament champions
- Conference: Big South Conference
- Record: 24–10 (15–3 Big South)
- Head coach: Pat Kelsey (8th season)
- Associate head coach: Dave Davis
- Assistant coaches: Brian Kloman; Justin Gray
- Home arena: Winthrop Coliseum

2019–20 Big South men's basketball standings
	Conf.				Overall
Team	W		L	PCT	W		L	PCT
Radford	15	–	3	.833	21	–	11	.656
Winthrop†	15	–	3	.833	24	–	10	.706
Gardner–Webb	11	–	7	.611	16	–	16	.500
Longwood	9	–	9	.500	14	–	18	.438
Hampton	8	–	10	.444	15	–	19	.441
UNC Asheville	8	–	10	.444	15	–	16	.484
USC Upstate	7	–	11	.389	13	–	20	.394
Charleston Southern	7	–	11	.389	14	–	18	.438
Presbyterian	7	–	11	.389	10	–	22	.313
High Point	6	–	12	.333	9	–	23	.281
Campbell	6	–	12	.333	15	–	16	.484
† 2020 Big South tournament winner

The 2019–20 Winthrop Eagles men's basketball team represented Winthrop University in the 2019–20 NCAA Division I men's basketball season. The Eagles, led by eighth-year head coach Pat Kelsey, played their home games at the Winthrop Coliseum in Rock Hill, South Carolina as members of the Big South Conference. They finished the season 24–10, 15–3 in Big South play to finish in a tie for the Big South regular season championship. They defeated USC Upstate, Gardner–Webb and Hampton to be champions of the Big South tournament and earn the conference's automatic bid to the NCAA tournament. However, the NCAA Tournament was cancelled amid the COVID-19 pandemic.

== Previous season ==
The Eagles finished the 2018–19 season 18–12 overall, 10–6 in Big South play to finish in a tie for second place. In the Big South tournament, they were defeated by Charleston Southern in the quarterfinals.

== Roster ==
2019–20 Winthrop Eagles men's basketball team
Players
Coaches

Pos.	#	Name	Height	Weight	Year	Hometown
G	0	Russell Jones Jr.	5 ft 8 in (1.73 m)	175 lb (79 kg)	Fr	Blythewood, South Carolina
C	2	Tom Pupavac	6 ft 10 in (2.08 m)	230 lb (104 kg)	Jr	Geelong, Australia
G	3	Micheal Anumba	6 ft 4 in (1.93 m)	220 lb (100 kg)	So	Reggio Emilia, Italy
G	4	Adonis Arms	6 ft 6 in (1.98 m)	185 lb (84 kg)	Jr	Milwaukee, Wisconsin
G	11	Charles Falden	6 ft 3 in (1.91 m)	200 lb (91 kg)	Jr	Richmond, Virginia
G	13	Hunter Hale	6 ft 3 in (1.91 m)	185 lb (84 kg)	RS Sr	Kalamazoo, Michigan
G	21	Jamal King	6 ft 5 in (1.96 m)	230 lb (104 kg)	Fr	Goldsboro, North Carolina
G	22	Kyle Zunic	6 ft 2 in (1.88 m)	195 lb (88 kg)	Jr	Wollongong, Australia
F	25	Josh Ferguson	6 ft 8 in (2.03 m)	210 lb (95 kg)	Sr	Miami, Florida
F	30	D. J. Burns	6 ft 9 in (2.06 m)	260 lb (118 kg)	RS Fr	Rock Hill, South Carolina
G	32	Josh Corbin	6 ft 3 in (1.91 m)	185 lb (84 kg)	Fr	Gahanna, Ohio
F	33	Chase Claxton	6 ft 7 in (2.01 m)	180 lb (82 kg)	Fr	Greenville, South Carolina
G	35	Keyshawn Hunter	6 ft 3 in (1.91 m)	185 lb (84 kg)	Jr	Charleston, South Carolina
G	52	Chandler Vaudrin	6 ft 7 in (2.01 m)	210 lb (95 kg)	RS Jr	Uniontown, Ohio

Head coach

- Pat Kelsey (Xavier)

Assistant coach(es)

- Dave Davis (Warren Wilson)
- Brian Kloman (Tennessee)
- Justin Gray (Wake Forest)

Legend

- (C) Team captain
- (S) Suspended
- (I) Ineligible
- (W) Walk-on
- Injured
- Current redshirt

Roster
Last update: January 24, 2020

== Schedule and results ==
Date time, TV	Rank^{#}	Opponent^{#}	Result	Record	Site (attendance) city, state
Non-conference regular season
November 7, 2019*; 7:00 pm		at Hartford	W 67–57	1–0	Chase Arena at Reich Family Pavilion (1,014); West Hartford, CT
November 10, 2019*; 5:00 pm		at Fresno State	L 74–77	1–1	Save Mart Center (8,529); Fresno, CA
November 11, 2019*; 9:00 pm		at No. 18 Saint Mary's	W 61–59	2–1	University Credit Union Pavilion (2,895); Moraga, CA
November 14, 2019*; 7:00 pm, ESPN+		at East Tennessee State	L 58–61	2–2	Freedom Hall Civic Center (4,118); Johnson City, TN
November 16, 2019*; 4:00 pm, ESPN+		Mid-Atlantic Christian	W 103–59	3–2	Winthrop Coliseum (2,516); Rock Hill, SC
November 21, 2019*; 7:30 pm, ESPN+		Tennessee Tech	L 58–61	3–3	Winthrop Coliseum (2,033); Rock Hill, SC
November 25, 2019*; 7:00 pm, ESPN+		Pfeiffer	W 127–83	4–3	Winthrop Coliseum (1,144); Rock Hill, SC
November 29, 2019*; 7:00 pm, ACCN		at No. 1 Duke	L 70–83	4–4	Cameron Indoor Stadium (9,314); Durham, NC
December 7, 2019*; 7:00 pm, ESPN+		Coastal Carolina	L 88–92	4–5	Winthrop Coliseum (2,734); Rock Hill, SC
December 11, 2019*; 8:00 pm, FSSW		at TCU	L 60–70	4–6	Schollmaier Arena (6,314); Fort Worth, TX
December 14, 2019*; 12:00 pm, ESPN+		at Furman	L 73–80	4–7	Timmons Arena (2,752); Greenville, SC
December 17, 2019*; 11:00 am, ESPN+		SIU Edwardsville	W 93–73	5–7	Winthrop Coliseum (5,312); Rock Hill, SC
December 21, 2019*; 2:00 pm, ESPN+		Elon	W 85–80	6–7	Winthrop Coliseum (2,139); Rock Hill, SC
Big South Conference regular season
January 2, 2020; 7:00 pm, ESPN+		Longwood	W 91–67	7–7 (1–0)	Winthrop Coliseum (1,325); Rock Hill, SC
January 4, 2020; 2:00 pm, ESPN+		at Campbell	W 87–72	8–7 (2–0)	Gore Arena (1,539); Buies Creek, NC
January 8, 2020; 7:00 pm, ESPN+		at High Point	W 79–57	9–7 (3–0)	Millis Athletic Convocation Center (1,107); High Point, NC
January 11, 2020; 7:00 pm, ESPN+		Gardner–Webb	W 99–95 ^{3OT}	10–7 (4–0)	Winthrop Coliseum (2,321); Rock Hill, SC
January 16, 2020; 7:00 pm, ESPN+		at Hampton	W 116–95	11–7 (5–0)	Hampton Convocation Center (3,123); Hampton, VA
January 20, 2020; 7:00 pm, ESPN3		at Radford	W 61–56	12–7 (6–0)	Dedmon Center (1,948); Radford, VA
January 23, 2020; 7:00 pm, ESPN+		USC Upstate	W 79–53	13–7 (7–0)	Winthrop Coliseum (2,034); Rock Hill, SC
January 25, 2020; 2:00 pm, ESPN+		Presbyterian	W 72–57	14–7 (8–0)	Winthrop Coliseum (3,011); Rock Hill, SC
January 30, 2020; 7:30 pm, ESPN+		at Charleston Southern	W 77–60	15–7 (9–0)	CSU Field House (947); North Charleston, SC
February 2, 2020; 2:00 pm, ESPN+		UNC Asheville	W 104–71	16–7 (10–0)	Winthrop Coliseum (2,834); Rock Hill, SC
February 6, 2020; 7:00 pm, ESPNU		Campbell	W 62–53	17–7 (11–0)	Winthrop Coliseum (1,910); Rock Hill, SC
February 8, 2020; 3:00 pm, ESPN+		at Longwood	W 70–68	18–7 (12–0)	Willett Hall (1,528); Farmville, VA
February 10, 2020; 7:00 pm, ESPN+		Radford	L 77–81	18–8 (12–1)	Winthrop Coliseum (2,415); Rock Hill, SC
February 13, 2020; 7:00 pm, ESPNU		at Gardner–Webb	L 70–74	18–9 (12–2)	Paul Porter Arena (2,351); Boiling Springs, NC
February 15, 2020; 4:00 pm, ESPN+		at Presbyterian	W 89–88	19–9 (13–2)	Templeton Physical Education Center (841); Clinton, SC
February 22, 2020; 1:00 pm, ESPN+		Hampton	L 81–87	19–10 (13–3)	Winthrop Coliseum (3,493); Rock Hill, SC
February 27, 2020; 6:00 pm		at USC Upstate	W 90–82	20–10 (14–3)	G. B. Hodge Center (833); Spartanburg, SC
February 29, 2020; 1:00 pm, ESPN+		High Point	W 84–76	21–10 (15–3)	Winthrop Coliseum (2,523); Rock Hill, SC
Big South tournament
March 5, 2020; 12:00 pm, ESPN3	(2)	vs. (7) USC Upstate; Quarterfinals	W 106–70	22–10	Dedmon Center (1,052); Radford, VA
March 6, 2020; 6:00 pm, ESPN+	(2)	vs. (3) Gardner–Webb; Semifinals	W 78–66	23–10	Dedmon Center; Radford, VA
March 8, 2020; 1:00 pm, ESPN	(2)	(5) Hampton; Championship	W 76–68	24–10	Winthrop Coliseum (4,866); Rock Hill, SC
*Non-conference game. ^{#}Rankings from AP Poll. (#) Tournament seedings in parentheses. All times are in Eastern.
