= 2019–20 Radford Highlanders men's basketball team =

American college basketball season

2019–20 Radford Highlanders men's basketball
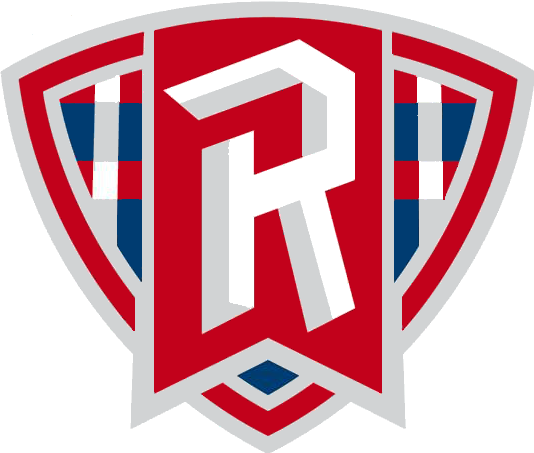

Big South regular season co-champions
- Conference: Big South Conference
- Record: 21–11 (15–3 Big South)
- Head coach: Mike Jones (9th season)
- Assistant coaches: Ron Jirsa; David Boyden; Donny Lind
- Home arena: Dedmon Center

2019–20 Big South men's basketball standings
	Conf.				Overall
Team	W		L	PCT	W		L	PCT
Radford	15	–	3	.833	21	–	11	.656
Winthrop†	15	–	3	.833	24	–	10	.706
Gardner–Webb	11	–	7	.611	16	–	16	.500
Longwood	9	–	9	.500	14	–	18	.438
Hampton	8	–	10	.444	15	–	19	.441
UNC Asheville	8	–	10	.444	15	–	16	.484
USC Upstate	7	–	11	.389	13	–	20	.394
Charleston Southern	7	–	11	.389	14	–	18	.438
Presbyterian	7	–	11	.389	10	–	22	.313
High Point	6	–	12	.333	9	–	23	.281
Campbell	6	–	12	.333	15	–	16	.484
† 2020 Big South tournament winner

The 2019–20 Radford Highlanders men's basketball team represented Radford University in the 2019–20 NCAA Division I men's basketball season. The Highlanders, led by ninth-year head coach Mike Jones, played their home games at the Dedmon Center in Radford, Virginia, as members of the Big South Conference. They finished the season 21–11, 15–3 in Big South play to win a share of the regular season championship. They defeated Charleston Southern in quarterfinals of the Big South tournament before losing in the semifinals to Hampton. As a regular season conference champion, and No. 1 seed in their conference tournament, who failed to win their conference tournament, they received an automatic bid to the NIT. However, the NIT, and all other postseason tournaments, were cancelled amid the COVID-19 pandemic.

== Previous season ==
The Highlanders finished the 2018–19 season 22–11 overall, 12–4 in Big South play to finish as regular season co-champions, alongside Campbell. In the Big South tournament, they defeated Presbyterian in the quarterfinals, Charleston Southern in the semifinals, before falling to Gardner–Webb in the championship game.

== Roster ==
2019–20 Radford Highlanders men's basketball team
Players
Coaches

Pos.	#	Name	Height	Weight	Year	Hometown
G	0	Devin Hutchinson	6 ft 5 in (1.96 m)	195 lb (88 kg)	Sr	Charlotte, North Carolina
G	1	Carlik Jones	6 ft 1 in (1.85 m)	180 lb (82 kg)	RS Jr	Cincinnati, Ohio
G	2	Quinton Morton-Robertson	5 ft 8 in (1.73 m)	150 lb (68 kg)	Fr	Radford, Virginia
G	3	Cle'von Greene	6 ft 1 in (1.85 m)	175 lb (79 kg)	So	Yorktown, Virginia
G	4	Josiah Jeffers	6 ft 1 in (1.85 m)	160 lb (73 kg)	So	Burlington, North Carolina
G	5	Donald Hicks	6 ft 3 in (1.91 m)	200 lb (91 kg)	Sr	Chesapeake, Virginia
G/F	10	Miles Jones	6 ft 6 in (1.98 m)	200 lb (91 kg)	Fr	Radford, Virginia
G	11	Travis Fields Jr.	5 ft 10 in (1.78 m)	170 lb (77 kg)	Sr	Portsmouth, Virginia
F	13	Leroy Butts IV	6 ft 7 in (2.01 m)	210 lb (95 kg)	Jr	Washington, D.C.
F	14	Chyree Walker	6 ft 5 in (1.96 m)	195 lb (88 kg)	RS So	Fairfax, Virginia
C	15	Devonnte Holland	6 ft 7 in (2.01 m)	240 lb (109 kg)	Sr	Martinsville, Virginia
F	20	Dravon Mangum	6 ft 9 in (2.06 m)	200 lb (91 kg)	So	Roxboro, North Carolina
G	21	Kobe Tigney	6 ft 3 in (1.91 m)	195 lb (88 kg)	Fr	Winchester, Virginia
C	22	Lewis Djonkam	6 ft 9 in (2.06 m)	245 lb (111 kg)	RS So	Springfield, Virginia
G	24	Jordan Hemphill	6 ft 5 in (1.96 m)	185 lb (84 kg)	Jr	Rogers, Arkansas
F	30	Devine Eke	6 ft 8 in (2.03 m)	205 lb (93 kg)	GS	Plainfield, New Jersey

Head coach

- Mike Jones (Howard)

Assistant coach(es)

- Ron Jirsa (Gettysburg)
- David Boyden (Western Kentucky)
- Donny Lind (Loyola (MD))

Legend

- (C) Team captain
- (S) Suspended
- (I) Ineligible
- (W) Walk-on
- Injured
- Current redshirt

Roster
Last update: January 24, 2020

== Schedule and results ==
Date time, TV	Rank^{#}	Opponent^{#}	Result	Record	Site (attendance) city, state
Exhibition
November 2, 2019*; 6:00 pm		Randolph	W 75–48		Dedmon Center; Radford, VA
Non-conference regular season
November 8, 2019*; 7:00 pm		at Liberty	L 60–66	0–1	Vines Center (7,872); Lynchburg, VA
November 12, 2019*; 7:00 pm		Bridgewater	W 91–40	1–1	Dedmon Center (1,360); Radford, VA
November 15, 2019*; 7:00 pm		at Georgia Southern	L 73–76	1–2	Hanner Fieldhouse (1,599); Statesboro, GA
November 19, 2019*; 8:00 pm		at Northwestern	W 67–56	2–2	Welsh–Ryan Arena (4,834); Evanston, IL
November 22, 2019*; 7:00 pm		at Bradley	L 61–70	2–3	Carver Arena (5,167); Peoria, IL
November 26, 2019*; 7:30 pm, ESPN+		at Monmouth	L 63–80	2–4	OceanFirst Bank Center (1,388); West Long Branch, NJ
December 4, 2019*; 7:00 pm, ESPN+		James Madison	W 94–71	3–4	Dedmon Center (1,879); Radford, VA
December 7, 2019*; 4:00 pm, ESPN+		UNC Greensboro	L 58–60	3–5	Dedmon Center (1,491); Radford, VA
December 14, 2019*; 2:00 pm		vs. Duquesne	L 49–71	3–6	Willoughby Gymnasium (812); Akron, OH
December 18, 2019*; 8:00 pm, SECN+		at Mississippi State	L 68–77	3–7	Humphrey Coliseum (6,101); Starkville, MS
December 22, 2019*; 3:30 pm		vs. Richmond	W 73–58	4–7	Entertainment and Sports Arena (1,381); Washington, D.C.
December 29, 2019*; 4:00 pm, ESPN+		Central Penn	W 90–45	5–7	Dedmon Center (861); Radford, VA
Big South Conference regular season
January 4, 2020; 4:30 pm, ESPN+		High Point	W 73–62	6–7 (1–0)	Dedmon Center (1,222); Radford, VA
January 8, 2020; 7:00 pm, ESPN+		at Gardner–Webb	W 67–64	7–7 (2–0)	Paul Porter Arena (1,459); Boiling Springs, NC
January 11, 2020; 2:00 pm, ESPN+		Campbell	W 68–63	8–7 (3–0)	Dedmon Center (1,316); Radford, VA
January 16, 2020; 6:00 pm, ESPN+		at USC Upstate	W 63–59	9–7 (4–0)	G. B. Hodge Center (800); Spartanburg, SC
January 18, 2020; 4:00 pm, ESPN+		at Presbyterian	W 75–64	10–7 (5–0)	Templeton Physical Education Center (665); Clinton, SC
January 20, 2020; 7:00 pm, ESPN3		Winthrop	L 56–61	10–8 (5–1)	Dedmon Center (1,948); Radford, VA
January 23, 2020; 6:00 pm, ESPN+		at UNC Asheville	L 67–80	10–9 (5–2)	Kimmel Arena (1,537); Asheville, NC
January 25, 2020; 4:00 pm, ESPN3		Hampton	W 83–79	11–9 (6–2)	Dedmon Center (1,690); Radford, VA
January 30, 2020; 7:00 pm, ESPN+		at Longwood	W 67–55	12–9 (7–2)	Willett Hall (1,613); Farmville, VA
February 1, 2020; 4:00 pm, ESPN+		Charleston Southern	W 77–74 ^{OT}	13–9 (8–2)	Dedmon Center (1,278); Radford, VA
February 8, 2020; 7:00 pm, ESPN+		at High Point	W 81–70	14–9 (9–2)	Millis Athletic Convocation Center (1,258); High Point, NC
February 10, 2020; 7:00 pm, ESPN+		at Winthrop	W 81–77	15–9 (10–2)	Winthrop Coliseum (2,415); Rock Hill, SC
February 13, 2020; 7:00 pm, ESPN+		Presbyterian	W 81–71	16–9 (11–2)	Dedmon Center (1,623); Radford, VA
February 15, 2020; 4:30 pm, ESPN+		at Campbell	W 73–60	17–9 (12–2)	Gore Arena (2,346); Buies Creek, NC
February 20, 2020; 9:00 pm, ESPNU		UNC Asheville	W 79–64	18–9 (13–2)	Dedmon Center (1,580); Radford, VA
February 22, 2020; 4:30 pm, ESPN+		USC Upstate	W 81–60	19–9 (14–2)	Dedmon Center (2,010); Radford, VA
February 27, 2020; 7:00 pm		at Hampton	W 81–78	20–9 (15–2)	Hampton Convocation Center (6,213); Hampton, VA
February 29, 2020; 4:00 pm, ESPN+		Gardner–Webb	L 62–70	20–10 (15–3)	Dedmon Center (2,245); Radford, VA
Big South tournament
March 5, 2020; 6:00 pm, ESPN3	(1)	(8) Charleston Southern; Quarterfinals	W 62–48	21–10	Dedmon Center (2,222); Radford, VA
March 6, 2020; 8:00 pm, ESPN+	(1)	(5) Hampton; Semifinals	L 78–86	21–11	Dedmon Center; Radford, VA
*Non-conference game. ^{#}Rankings from AP Poll. (#) Tournament seedings in parentheses. All times are in Eastern.
