= 2019–20 Presbyterian Blue Hose men's basketball team =

American college basketball season

2019–20 Presbyterian Blue Hose men's basketball
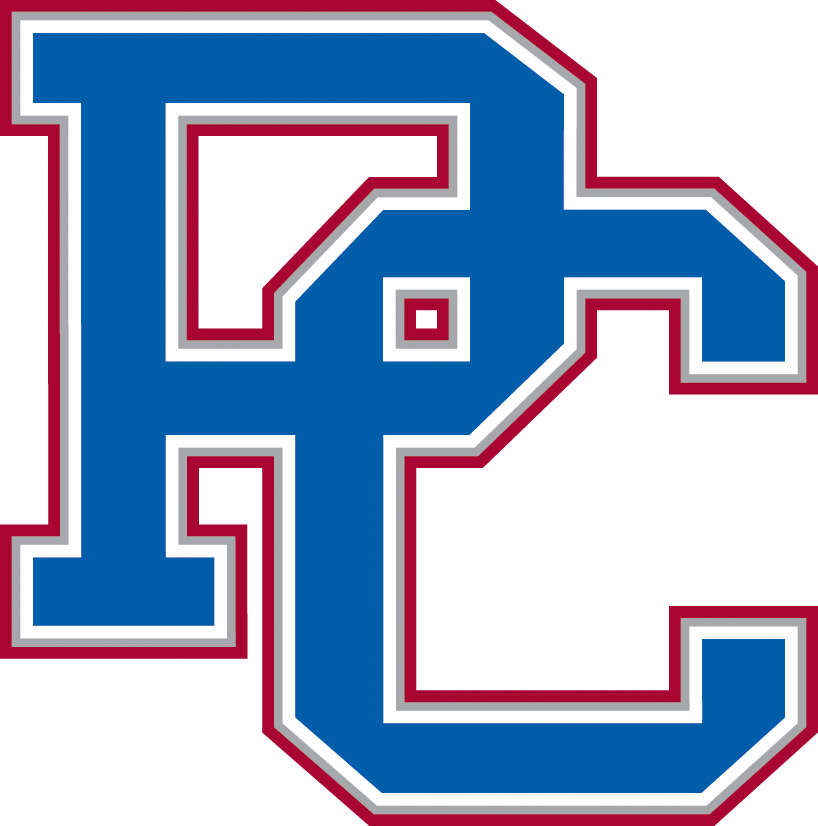
- Conference: Big South Conference
- Record: 10–22 (7–11 Big South)
- Head coach: Quinton Ferrell (1st season)
- Assistant coaches: Ben Korren; Trey Meyer; Nick Lagroone
- Home arena: Templeton Physical Education Center

2019–20 Big South men's basketball standings
	Conf.				Overall
Team	W		L	PCT	W		L	PCT
Radford	15	–	3	.833	21	–	11	.656
Winthrop†	15	–	3	.833	24	–	10	.706
Gardner–Webb	11	–	7	.611	16	–	16	.500
Longwood	9	–	9	.500	14	–	18	.438
Hampton	8	–	10	.444	15	–	19	.441
UNC Asheville	8	–	10	.444	15	–	16	.484
USC Upstate	7	–	11	.389	13	–	20	.394
Charleston Southern	7	–	11	.389	14	–	18	.438
Presbyterian	7	–	11	.389	10	–	22	.313
High Point	6	–	12	.333	9	–	23	.281
Campbell	6	–	12	.333	15	–	16	.484
† 2020 Big South tournament winner

The 2019–20 Presbyterian Blue Hose men's basketball team represented Presbyterian College in the 2019–20 NCAA Division I men's basketball season. The Blue Hose, led by first-year head coach Quinton Ferrell, played their home games at the Templeton Physical Education Center in Clinton, South Carolina, as members of the Big South Conference. They finished the season 10–22, 7–11 in Big South play to finish in a three-way tie for seventh place. They lost in the first round of the Big South tournament to Charleston Southern.

== Previous season ==
The Blue Hose finished the 2018–19 season 20–16 overall, 9–7 in Big South play to finish in a tie for fifth place. In the Big South tournament, they defeated UNC Asheville in the first round, before falling to Radford in the quarterfinals. The Blue Hose received an invitation to the CIT, where they beat Seattle in the first round, Robert Morris in the second round, before falling to Marshall in the quarterfinals.

On March 28, 2019, it was announced that former head coach Dustin Kerns was named the new head coach at Appalachian State. On April 11, 2019, former assistant coach at College of Charleston and Presbyterian alum Quinton Ferrell was announced as Kerns' replacement.

== Roster ==
2019–20 Presbyterian Blue Hose men's basketball team
Players
Coaches

Pos.	#	Name	Height	Weight	Year	Hometown
G	0	Chris Martin	6 ft 0 in (1.83 m)	181 lb (82 kg)	So	Charlotte, North Carolina
G	2	Kody Shubert	5 ft 11 in (1.8 m)	160 lb (73 kg)	So	Maiden, North Carolina
G	3	CJ Melton	6 ft 4 in (1.93 m)	167 lb (76 kg)	Fr	Hoover, Alabama
F	4	Ben Drake	6 ft 8 in (2.03 m)	225 lb (102 kg)	RS Sr	Kennesaw, Georgia
G	5	Zeb Graham	6 ft 0 in (1.83 m)	170 lb (77 kg)	Fr	Fort Mill, South Carolina
G	10	Sean Jenkins	6 ft 4 in (1.93 m)	180 lb (82 kg)	Fr	Spartanburg, South Carolina
C	11	Armel TeTe	6 ft 9 in (2.06 m)	210 lb (95 kg)	Sr	Fayetteville, North Carolina
F	12	Cory Hightower	6 ft 7 in (2.01 m)	215 lb (98 kg)	So	Flint, Michigan
G	13	Tristen Becker	6 ft 3 in (1.91 m)	190 lb (86 kg)	Sr	Chicago, Illinois
F	15	Owen McCormack	6 ft 9 in (2.06 m)	212 lb (96 kg)	Fr	Advance, North Carolina
G	22	Michael Isler	6 ft 4 in (1.93 m)	185 lb (84 kg)	Fr	Albany, Georgia
G	23	Jordan Gibson	6 ft 5 in (1.96 m)	190 lb (86 kg)	So	Bristow, Virginia
G	25	JC Younger	6 ft 4 in (1.93 m)	200 lb (91 kg)	Sr	Mandeville, Louisiana
F	33	Jack McMahon	6 ft 3 in (1.91 m)	210 lb (95 kg)	Fr	Hickory, North Carolina

Head coach

- Quinton Ferrell (Presbyterian)

Assistant coach(es)

- Ben Korren (College of Charleston)
- Trey Meyer (Clemson)
- Nick Lagroone (Southern Wesleyan)

Legend

- (C) Team captain
- (S) Suspended
- (I) Ineligible
- (W) Walk-on
- Injured
- Current redshirt

Roster
Last update: January 24, 2020

== Schedule and results ==
Date time, TV	Rank^{#}	Opponent^{#}	Result	Record	Site (attendance) city, state
Exhibition
October 30, 2019*; 7:00 pm		Johnson & Wales (NC)	W 95–64		Templeton Center; Clinton, SC
Non-conference regular season
November 7, 2019*; 7:00 pm, ACCN		at Clemson	L 45–79	0–1	Littlejohn Coliseum (5,713); Clemson, SC
November 11, 2019*; 7:00 pm, ESPN+		at VMI	W 80–77 ^{OT}	1–1	Cameron Hall (985); Lexington, VA
November 14, 2019*; 7:00 pm, ESPN+		Morehead State	L 55–77	1–2	Templeton Center (498); Clinton, SC
November 18, 2019*; 7:00 pm, ACCN Extra		at Notre Dame	L 53–63	1–3	Edmund P. Joyce Center (5,752); South Bend, IN
November 22, 2019*; 5:00 pm		vs. Sacred Heart; Bobcat Invitational	L 57–83	1–4	People's United Center (890); Hamden, CT
November 23, 2019*; 6:30 pm, ESPN+		at Quinnipiac; Bobcat Invitational	W 73–64	1–5	People's United Center (872); Hamden, CT
November 24, 2019*; 1:00 pm		vs. Albany; Bobcat Invitational	W 65–60	1–6	People's United Center (883); Hamden, CT
November 30, 2019*; 4:00 pm, ESPN+		Toccoa Falls	W 87–59	2–6	Templeton Center (130); Clinton, SC
December 7, 2019*; 2:00 pm		at South Carolina State	L 68–80	2–7	SHM Memorial Center (239); Orangeburg, SC
December 10, 2019*; 3:00 pm		at St. Francis Brooklyn	L 63–64	2–8	Generoso Pope Athletic Complex (264); Brooklyn Heights, NY
December 18, 2019*; 7:00 pm, ESPN+		Jacksonville	L 58–81	2–9	Templeton Center (127); Clinton, SC
December 21, 2019*; 12:00 pm, BTN		at No. 14 Michigan	L 44–86	2–10	Crisler Center (12,707); Ann Arbor, MI
December 29, 2019*; 2:00 pm, ESPN+		Kentucky Christian	W 81–56	3–10	Templeton Center (175); Clinton, SC
Big South Conference regular season
January 2, 2020; 7:00 pm, ESPN+		UNC Asheville	W 79–77	4–10 (1–0)	Templeton Center (185); Clinton, SC
January 4, 2020; 3:00 pm, ESPN+		at Gardner–Webb	W 68–62	5–10 (2–0)	Paul Porter Arena (1,253); Boiling Springs, NC
January 11, 2020; 4:00 pm, ESPN+		High Point	W 77–62	6–10 (3–0)	Templeton Center (482); Clinton, SC
January 16, 2020; 7:00 pm, ESPN+		at Longwood	W 74–67	7–10 (4–0)	Willett Hall (1,408); Farmville, VA
January 18, 2020; 4:00 pm, ESPN+		Radford	L 64–75	7–11 (4–1)	Templeton Center (665); Clinton, SC
January 20, 2020; 7:00 pm, ESPN+		Campbell	W 85–79	8–11 (5–1)	Templeton Center (402); Clinton, SC
January 23, 2020; 7:30 pm, ESPN3		at Charleston Southern	L 66–74	8–12 (5–2)	CSU Field House (753); North Charleston, SC
January 25, 2020; 2:00 pm, ESPN+		at Winthrop	L 57–72	8–13 (5–3)	Winthrop Coliseum (3,011); Rock Hill, SC
January 30, 2020; 7:00 pm, ESPNU		USC Upstate	L 74–77	8–14 (5–4)	Templeton Center (889); Clinton, SC
February 1, 2020; 4:00 pm, ESPN+		at Hampton	L 81–87 ^{OT}	8–15 (5–5)	Hampton Convocation Center (4,124); Hampton, VA
February 6, 2020; 7:00 pm, ESPN+		Gardner–Webb	W 65–61	9–15 (6–5)	Templeton Center (279); Clinton, SC
February 8, 2020; 4:30 pm, ESPN+		at Campbell	L 62–79	9–16 (6–6)	Gore Arena (1,993); Buies Creek, NC
February 13, 2020; 7:00 pm, ESPN+		at Radford	L 71–81	9–17 (6–7)	Dedmon Center (1,623); Radford, VA
February 15, 2020; 4:00 pm, ESPN+		Winthrop	L 88–89	9–18 (6–8)	Templeton Center (841); Clinton, SC
February 20, 2020; 7:00 pm, ESPN+		at High Point	L 70–82	9–19 (6–9)	Millis Athletic Convocation Center (1,051); High Point, NC
February 22, 2020; 4:30 pm, ESPN+		at UNC Asheville	L 64–75	9–20 (6–10)	Kimmel Arena (2,578); Asheville, NC
February 27, 2020; 7:00 pm, ESPN+		Longwood	L 55–58	9–21 (6–11)	Templeton Center (281); Clinton, SC
February 29, 2020; 4:00 pm, ESPN+		Charleston Southern	W 76–65	10–21 (7–11)	Templeton Center (415); Clinton, SC
Big South tournament
March 3, 2020; 7:00 pm, ESPN3	(9)	at (8) Charleston Southern; First round	L 64–81	10–22	CSU Fieldhouse (691); North Charleston, SC
*Non-conference game. ^{#}Rankings from AP Poll. (#) Tournament seedings in parentheses. All times are in Eastern.
