= 2019–20 UNC Asheville Bulldogs men's basketball team =

American college basketball season

2019–20 UNC Asheville Bulldogs men's basketball
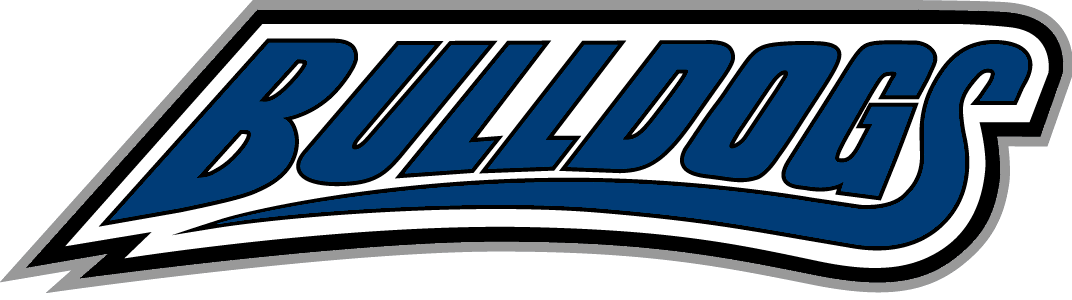
- Conference: Big South Conference
- Record: 15–16 (8–10 Big South)
- Head coach: Mike Morrell (2nd season)
- Assistant coaches: Mike Venezia; Neil Dixon; Woody Taylor
- Home arena: Kimmel Arena

2019–20 Big South men's basketball standings
	Conf.				Overall
Team	W		L	PCT	W		L	PCT
Radford	15	–	3	.833	21	–	11	.656
Winthrop†	15	–	3	.833	24	–	10	.706
Gardner–Webb	11	–	7	.611	16	–	16	.500
Longwood	9	–	9	.500	14	–	18	.438
Hampton	8	–	10	.444	15	–	19	.441
UNC Asheville	8	–	10	.444	15	–	16	.484
USC Upstate	7	–	11	.389	13	–	20	.394
Charleston Southern	7	–	11	.389	14	–	18	.438
Presbyterian	7	–	11	.389	10	–	22	.313
High Point	6	–	12	.333	9	–	23	.281
Campbell	6	–	12	.333	15	–	16	.484
† 2020 Big South tournament winner

The 2019–20 UNC Asheville Bulldogs men's basketball team represented the University of North Carolina at Asheville in the 2019–20 NCAA Division I men's basketball season. The Bulldogs, led by second-year head coach Mike Morrell, played their home games at Kimmel Arena in Asheville, North Carolina, as members of the Big South Conference. They finished the season 15–16, 8–10 in Big South play to finish in a tie for fifth place. They defeated Campbell in the first round of the Big South tournament before losing in the quarterfinals to Gardner–Webb.

== Previous season ==
The Bulldogs finished the 2018–19 season 4–27 overall, 2–14 in Big South play to finish in tenth place. In the Big South tournament, they were defeated by Presbyterian in the first round.

== Roster ==
2019–20 UNC Asheville Bulldogs men's basketball team
Players
Coaches

Pos.	#	Name	Height	Weight	Year	Hometown
G	0	Lavar Batts, Jr.	6 ft 3 in (1.91 m)	185 lb (84 kg)	RS So	Concord, North Carolina
G	1	Cress Worthy	6 ft 2 in (1.88 m)	170 lb (77 kg)	So	Gastonia, North Carolina
G	2	LJ Thorpe	6 ft 5 in (1.96 m)	215 lb (98 kg)	So	West Palm Beach, Florida
G	3	Tajion Jones	6 ft 5 in (1.96 m)	190 lb (86 kg)	So	Oak Ridge, Tennessee
F	4	Stephen Edoka	6 ft 4 in (1.93 m)	218 lb (99 kg)	So	Abuja, Nigeria
G	5	Trent Stephney	6 ft 2 in (1.88 m)	160 lb (73 kg)	Fr	Knoxville, Tennessee
G	11	Jamon Battle	6 ft 5 in (1.96 m)	210 lb (95 kg)	Fr	Richmond, Virginia
F	14	Luke Lawson	6 ft 7 in (2.01 m)	180 lb (82 kg)	So	Coeburn, Virginia
G	20	DeVon Baker	6 ft 2 in (1.88 m)	190 lb (86 kg)	So	Dayton, Ohio
F	21	Jax Levitch	6 ft 7 in (2.01 m)	210 lb (95 kg)	RS Jr	Louisville, Kentucky
F	22	Coty Jude	6 ft 9 in (2.06 m)	190 lb (86 kg)	So	Fort Gay, West Virginia
G	24	AJ McBride	6 ft 1 in (1.85 m)	—	Fr	Houston, Texas
G	30	Deacon Heath	6 ft 0 in (1.83 m)	170 lb (77 kg)	So	Banner Elk, North Carolina
F	34	Jeremy Peck	6 ft 9 in (2.06 m)	240 lb (109 kg)	Jr	Houston, Texas

Head coach

- Mike Morrell (Milligan)

Assistant coach(es)

- Mike Venezia (Colgate)
- Neil Dixon (West Virginia)
- Woody Taylor (Eckerd)

Legend

- (C) Team captain
- (S) Suspended
- (I) Ineligible
- (W) Walk-on
- Injured
- Current redshirt

Roster
Last update: October 9, 2019

== Schedule and results ==
Date time, TV	Rank^{#}	Opponent^{#}	Result	Record	Site (attendance) city, state
Exhibition
October 31, 2019*; 5:00 pm		Bob Jones	W 91–70		Kimmel Arena; Asheville, NC
Non-conference regular season
November 5, 2019*; 7:00 pm		at Tennessee	L 63–78	0–1	Thompson–Boling Arena (19,273); Knoxville, TN
November 9, 2019*; 12:00 pm		at The Citadel	W 91–76	1–1	McAlister Field House (742); Charleston, SC
November 13, 2019*; 7:00 pm, ACCNX		at Wake Forest	L 79–98	1–2	LJVM Coliseum (4,187); Winston-Salem, NC
November 16, 2019*; 6:00 pm, ESPN+		Brevard	W 79–49	2–2	Kimmel Arena (1,474); Asheville, NC
November 21, 2019*; 6:00 pm, ESPN+		St. Andrews	W 105–69	3–2	Kimmel Arena (1,278); Asheville, NC
December 3, 2019*; 7:00 pm		at Charlotte	W 83–75	4–2	Dale F. Halton Arena (3,324); Charlotte, NC
December 7, 2019*; 4:00 pm		at Western Carolina	L 77–78	4–3	Ramsey Center (2,302); Cullowhee, NC
December 11, 2019*; 7:00 pm		at South Carolina State	L 85–90	4–4	SHM Memorial Center (198); Orangeburg, SC
December 14, 2019*; 2:00 pm, ESPN+		UT Martin	W 91–72	5–4	Kimmel Arena (1,395); Asheville, NC
December 17, 2019*; 6:00 pm, ESPN+		Stetson	W 78–76	6–4	Kimmel Arena (1,891); Asheville, NC
December 21, 2019*; 2:00 pm, ESPN+		Chattanooga	L 64–68	6–5	Kimmel Arena (1,449); Asheville, NC
Big South Conference regular season
January 2, 2020; 7:00 pm, ESPN+		at Presbyterian	L 77–79	6–6 (0–1)	Templeton Physical Education Center (185); Clinton, SC
January 8, 2020; 6:00 pm, ESPN+		at Campbell	L 62–64	6–7 (0–2)	Gore Arena (1,195); Buies Creek, NC
January 11, 2020; 5:30 pm, ESPN+		at Charleston Southern	W 71–69	7–7 (1–2)	CSU Field House (714); North Charleston, SC
January 16, 2020; 6:00 pm, ESPN+		High Point	L 66–68	7–8 (1–3)	Kimmel Arena (1,176); Asheville, NC
January 18, 2020; 2:00 pm, ESPN+		Hampton	L 86–88	7–9 (1–4)	Kimmel Arena (1,912); Asheville, NC
January 20, 2020; 7:00 pm, ESPN+		at Longwood	W 71–66	8–9 (2–4)	Willett Hall (1,218); Farmville, VA
January 23, 2020; 6:00 pm, ESPN+		Radford	W 80–67	9–9 (3–4)	Kimmel Arena (1,537); Asheville, NC
January 25, 2020; 4:00 pm, ESPN+		at USC Upstate	L 63–80	9–10 (3–5)	G. B. Hodge Center (579); Spartanburg, SC
January 30, 2020; 6:00 pm, ESPN+		Gardner–Webb	L 56–70	9–11 (3–6)	Kimmel Arena (1,232); Asheville, NC
February 1, 2020; 2:00 pm, ESPN+		at Winthrop	L 71–104	9–12 (3–7)	Winthrop Coliseum (2,834); Rock Hill, SC
February 6, 2020; 6:00 pm, ESPN+		USC Upstate	W 84–71	10–12 (4–7)	Kimmel Arena (1,234); Asheville, NC
February 10, 2020; 7:00 pm, ESPN+		at Hampton	L 70–80	10–13 (4–8)	Hampton Convocation Center (3,123); Hampton, VA
February 13, 2020; 6:00 pm, ESPN+		Longwood	W 73–71	11–13 (5–8)	Kimmel Arena (1,615); Asheville, NC
February 15, 2020; 4:30 pm, ESPN+		Charleston Southern	W 79–75	12–13 (6–8)	Kimmel Arena (2,122); Asheville, NC
February 20, 2020; 9:00 pm, ESPNU		at Radford	L 64–79	12–14 (6–9)	Dedmon Center (1,580); Radford, VA
February 22, 2020; 4:30 pm, ESPN+		Presbyterian	W 75–64	13–14 (7–9)	Kimmel Arena (2,578); Asheville, NC
February 27, 2020; 7:00 pm, ESPN+		at High Point	W 80–76	14–14 (8–9)	Millis Athletic Convocation Center (1,204); High Point, NC
February 29, 2020; 4:30 pm, ESPN+		at Campbell	L 69–78	14–15 (8–10)	Gore Arena (1,818); Buies Creek, NC
Big South tournament
March 3, 2020; 7:00 pm, ESPN3	(6)	(11) Campbell; First round	W 72–68	15–15	Kimmel Arena (901); Asheville, NC
March 5, 2020; 2:00 pm, ESPN3	(6)	vs. (3) Gardner–Webb; Quarterfinals	L 62–72	15–16	Dedmon Center (1,052); Radford, VA
*Non-conference game. ^{#}Rankings from AP Poll. (#) Tournament seedings in parentheses. All times are in Eastern.
