= 2019–20 Charleston Southern Buccaneers men's basketball team =

American college basketball season

2019–20 Charleston Southern Buccaneers men's basketball
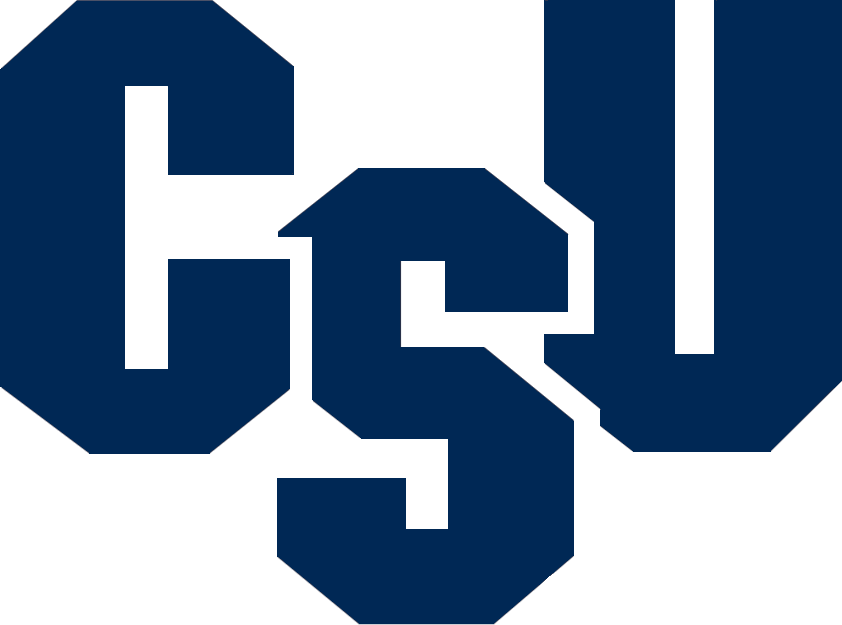
- Conference: Big South Conference
- Record: 14–18 (7–11 Big South)
- Head coach: Barclay Radebaugh (15th season)
- Assistant coaches: Rick Duckett; Thomas Butters; Saah Nimley
- Home arena: CSU Field House

2019–20 Big South men's basketball standings
	Conf.				Overall
Team	W		L	PCT	W		L	PCT
Radford	15	–	3	.833	21	–	11	.656
Winthrop†	15	–	3	.833	24	–	10	.706
Gardner–Webb	11	–	7	.611	16	–	16	.500
Longwood	9	–	9	.500	14	–	18	.438
Hampton	8	–	10	.444	15	–	19	.441
UNC Asheville	8	–	10	.444	15	–	16	.484
USC Upstate	7	–	11	.389	13	–	20	.394
Charleston Southern	7	–	11	.389	14	–	18	.438
Presbyterian	7	–	11	.389	10	–	22	.313
High Point	6	–	12	.333	9	–	23	.281
Campbell	6	–	12	.333	15	–	16	.484
† 2020 Big South tournament winner

The 2019–20 Charleston Southern Buccaneers men's basketball team represented Charleston Southern University in the 2019–20 NCAA Division I men's basketball season. The Buccaneers, led by 15th-year head coach Barclay Radebaugh, played their home games at the CSU Field House in North Charleston, South Carolina as members of the Big South Conference. They finished the season 14–18, 7–11 in Big South play, to finish in a three-way tie for seventh place. They defeated Presbyterian in the first round of the Big South tournament before losing in the quarterfinals to Radford.

== Previous season ==
The Buccaneers finished the 2018–19 season 18–16 overall, 9–7 in Big South play, to finish in a tie for fifth place. In the Big South tournament, they defeated USC Upstate in the first round, upset Winthrop in the quarterfinals, before losing to Radford in the semifinals. They received an invitation to the CIT, where they defeated Florida Atlantic in the first round before falling to Hampton in the second round.

== Roster ==
2019–20 Charleston Southern Buccaneers men's basketball team
Players
Coaches

Pos.	#	Name	Height	Weight	Year	Hometown
G	0	Travis Anderson	6 ft 0 in (1.83 m)	175 lb (79 kg)	So	Atlanta, GA
F	1	Terence Jr. Porter	6 ft 8 in (2.03 m)	200 lb (91 kg)	Fr	Atlanta, GA
G	2	Nate Louis	5 ft 11 in (1.8 m)	165 lb (75 kg)	Sr	Miami, FL
G	4	Deontaye Buskey	6 ft 1 in (1.85 m)	160 lb (73 kg)	Jr	Daphne, AL
G/F	10	Jamir Moore	6 ft 5 in (1.96 m)	180 lb (82 kg)	So	Miramar, FL
F	12	Ty Jones	6 ft 6 in (1.98 m)	215 lb (98 kg)	Jr	Pontotoc, MS
F	14	Duncan LeXander	6 ft 8 in (2.03 m)	205 lb (93 kg)	So	Davidson, NC
C	22	Sadarius Bowser	6 ft 9 in (2.06 m)	220 lb (100 kg)	So	Gaffney, SC
G	23	Sean Price	6 ft 3 in (1.91 m)	200 lb (91 kg)	Jr	Port Charlotte, FL
G	24	Phlandrous Jr. Fleming	6 ft 4 in (1.93 m)	195 lb (88 kg)	Jr	Athens, GA
G	30	Matt Kormylo	6 ft 5 in (1.96 m)	210 lb (95 kg)	Fr	Greenville, SC
G	33	Dontrell Shuler	6 ft 2 in (1.88 m)	180 lb (82 kg)	So	Columbia, SC
G	50	Malik Battle	6 ft 3 in (1.91 m)	180 lb (82 kg)	Fr	Atlanta, GA

Head coach

- Barclay Radebaugh (East Tennessee State)

Assistant coach(es)

- Rick Duckett (North Carolina)
- Thomas Butters (Clemson)
- Saah Nimley (Charleston Southern)

Legend

- (C) Team captain
- (S) Suspended
- (I) Ineligible
- (W) Walk-on
- Injured
- Current redshirt

Roster
Last update: January 24, 2020

== Schedule and results ==
Date time, TV	Rank^{#}	Opponent^{#}	Result	Record	Site (attendance) city, state
Non-conference regular season
November 5, 2019*; 7:30 p.m., ESPN+		Columbia International	W 99–71	1–0	CSU Field House (802); North Charleston, SC
November 8, 2019*; 7:00 p.m.		at North Carolina A&T	L 49–63	1–1	Corbett Sports Center (1,904); Greensboro, NC
November 12, 2019*; 7:30 p.m., ESPN+		Furman	L 47–91	1–2	CSU Field House (881); North Charleston, SC
November 16, 2019*; 7:00 p.m., FSOH		at Dayton	L 61–90	1–3	UD Arena (13,407); Dayton, OH
November 18, 2019*; 6:30 p.m., BTN		at No. 3 Michigan State	L 46–94	1–4	Breslin Center (14,797); East Lansing, MI
November 23, 2019*; 11:30 a.m.		vs. Southern Utah; Maui on the Mainland	W 80–45	1–5	Freedom Hall Civic Center (2,526); Johnson City, TN
November 24, 2019*; 11:30		vs. Delaware State; Maui on the Mainland	W 71–61	2–5	Freedom Hall Civic Center (2,509); Johnson City, TN
December 3, 2019*; 7:00 p.m., SECN+		at Missouri	L 60–68	3–5	Mizzou Arena (7,894); Columbia, MO
December 7, 2019*; 5:30 p.m., ESPN+		North Carolina Central	W 58–53	4–5	CSU Field House (622); North Charleston, SC
December 16, 2019*; 7:00 p.m., FloSports		at James Madison	W 81–60	4–6	JMU Convocation Center (2,046); Harrisonburg, VA
December 21, 2019*; 7:00 p.m., ESPN+		at Eastern Kentucky	L 69–76	5–6	McBrayer Arena (1,707); Richmond, KY
December 28, 2019*; 5:30 p.m., ESPN+		Piedmont International	W 108–52	6–6	CSU Field House (173); North Charleston, SC
Big South Conference regular season
January 2, 2020; 7:30 p.m., ESPN+		USC Upstate	W 89–75	7–6 (1–0)	CSU Field House (632); North Charleston, SC
January 4, 2020; 6:00 p.m., ESPN+		at Hampton	L 85–92	7–7 (1–1)	Hampton Convocation Center (3,123); Hampton, VA
January 8, 2020; 7:30 p.m., ESPN+		Longwood	L 56–74	7–8 (1–2)	CSU Field House (417); North Charleston, SC
January 11, 2020; 5:30 p.m., ESPN+		UNC Asheville	L 69–71	7–9 (1–3)	CSU Field House (714); North Charleston, SC
January 16, 2020; 7:00 p.m., ESPNU		at Campbell	W 77–62	8–9 (2–3)	Gore Arena (1,887); Buies Creek, NC
January 18, 2020; 2:00 p.m., ESPN3		at High Point	W 79–60	9–9 (3–3)	Millis Center (1,272); High Point, NC
January 23, 2020; 7:30 p.m., ESPN+		Presbyterian	W 74–66	10–9 (4–3)	CSU Field House (753); North Charleston, SC
January 25, 2020; 4:30 p.m., ESPN+		at Gardner–Webb	W 92–83 ^{2OT}	11–9 (5–3)	Paul Porter Arena (1,432); Boiling Springs, NC
January 30, 2020; 7:30 p.m., ESPN+		Winthrop	L 60–77	11–10 (5–4)	CSU Field House (947); North Charleston, SC
February 1, 2020; 4:00 p.m., ESPN+		at Radford	L 74–77 ^{OT}	11–11 (5–5)	Dedmon Center (1,278); Radford, VA
February 6, 2020; 7:00 p.m., ESPN+		at Longwood	L 63–71	11–12 (5–6)	Willett Hall (1,351); Farmville, VA
February 8, 2020; 5:30 p.m., ESPN+		Hampton	W 82–75	12–12 (6–6)	CSU Field House (736); North Charleston, SC
February 10, 2020; 6:00 p.m., ESPN+		at USC Upstate	L 52–66	12–13 (6–7)	G. B. Hodge Center (745); Spartanburg, SC
February 13, 2020; 7:30 p.m., ESPN+		High Point	W 66–63	13–13 (7–7)	CSU Field House (693); North Charleston, SC
February 15, 2020; 4:30 p.m., ESPN+		at UNC Asheville	L 75–79	13–14 (7–8)	Kimmel Arena (2,122); Asheville, NC
February 20, 2020; 7:30 p.m., ESPN+		Campbell	L 51–66	13–15 (7–9)	CSU Field House (715); North Charleston, SC
February 27, 2020; 7:30 p.m., ESPN+		Gardner–Webb	L 74–83	13–16 (7–10)	CSU Field House (732); North Charleston, SC
February 29, 2020; 4:00 p.m., ESPN+		at Presbyterian	L 65–76	13–17 (7–11)	Templeton Physical Education Center (415); Clinton, SC
Big South tournament
March 3, 2020; 7:00 p.m., ESPN3	(8)	(9) Presbyterian; First round	W 81–64	14–17	CSU Fieldhouse (691); North Charleston, SC
March 5, 2020; 6:00 p.m., ESPN3	(8)	at (1) Radford; Quarterfinals	L 48–62	14–18	Dedmon Center (2,222); Radford, VA
*Non-conference game. ^{#}Rankings from AP poll. (#) Tournament seedings in parentheses. All times are in Eastern.
