= 2020 Big South Conference men's basketball tournament =

- Classification: Division I
- Season: 2019–20
- Teams: 11
- Site: Campus sites (first round); Dedmon Center (quarterfinals and semifinals); Winthrop Coliseum (championship)
- Champions: Winthrop (12th title)
- Winning coach: Pat Kelsey (2nd title)
- MVP: Hunter Hale (Winthrop)
- Television: ESPN3, ESPN+, ESPN

2019–20 Big South men's basketball standings
	Conf.				Overall
Team	W		L	PCT	W		L	PCT
Radford	15	–	3	.833	21	–	11	.656
Winthrop†	15	–	3	.833	24	–	10	.706
Gardner–Webb	11	–	7	.611	16	–	16	.500
Longwood	9	–	9	.500	14	–	18	.438
Hampton	8	–	10	.444	15	–	19	.441
UNC Asheville	8	–	10	.444	15	–	16	.484
USC Upstate	7	–	11	.389	13	–	20	.394
Charleston Southern	7	–	11	.389	14	–	18	.438
Presbyterian	7	–	11	.389	10	–	22	.313
High Point	6	–	12	.333	9	–	23	.281
Campbell	6	–	12	.333	15	–	16	.484
† 2020 Big South tournament winner

The 2020 Big South men's basketball tournament was the postseason men's basketball tournament that ended the 2019–20 NCAA Division I men's basketball season of the Big South Conference. It was held from March 3 through March 8, 2020 at various campus sites. The Winthrop Eagles received the automatic bid to the NCAA tournament after defeating Hampton 76–68 in the championship game.

== Sites ==
The first round was played at campus sites at the home of the higher seed. The quarterfinals and semifinals were played at the home of regular-season champion and No. 1 seed. The championship game was held at the home of the highest remaining seed after the semifinals.

== Seeds ==
All 11 conference teams are eligible for the tournament. The top five teams receive a first-round bye. Teams are seeded by record within the conference, with a tiebreaker system to seed teams with identical conference records.

The tiebreakers operate in the following order:

1. Head-to-head record.
2. Record against the top-ranked conference team not involved in the tie, going down the standings until the tie is broken. For this purpose, teams with the same conference record are considered collectively. If two teams were unbeaten or winless against an opponent but did not play the same number of games against that opponent, the tie is not considered broken.

Seed	School	Conference	Overall	Tiebreaker 1	Tiebreaker 2
1	Radford	15–3		1–1 vs. Winthrop	1–1 vs. Gardner–Webb; 3–1 vs. Hampton/UNC Asheville
2	Winthrop	15–3		1–1 vs. Radford	1–1 vs. Gardner–Webb; 2–1 vs. Hampton/UNC Asheville
3	Gardner–Webb	11–7			
4	Longwood	9–9			
5	Hampton	8–10		2–0 vs. UNC Asheville	
6	UNC Asheville	8–10		0–2 vs. Hampton	
7	USC Upstate	7–11		2–1 vs. Charleston Southern/Presbyterian	
8	Charleston Southern	7–11		2–2 vs. USC Upstate/Presbyterian	
9	Presbyterian	7–11		1–2 vs. USC Upstate/Charleston Southern	
10	High Point	6−12		1–0 vs. Campbell	
11	Campbell	6−12		0–1 vs. High Point	

== Schedule ==
Game	Time*	Matchup No.	Score	Television
First round - Tuesday, March 3 Campus sites
1	7:00 pm	No. 10 High Point at No. 7 USC Upstate	59–69	ESPN3
2	7:00 pm	No. 11 Campbell at No. 6 UNC Asheville	68–72	ESPN3
3	7:00 pm	No. 9 Presbyterian at No. 8 Charleston Southern	64–81	ESPN3
Quarterfinals - Thursday, March 5 at Dedmon Center; Radford, VA
4	12:00 pm	No. 7 USC Upstate vs. No. 2 Winthrop	70-106	ESPN3
5	2:00 pm	No. 6 UNC Asheville vs. No. 3 Gardner–Webb	62–72	ESPN3
6	6:00 pm	No. 8 Charleston Southern vs. No. 1 Radford	48–62	ESPN3
7	8:00 pm	No. 5 Hampton vs. No. 4 Longwood	78–53	ESPN3
Semifinals - Friday, March 6 at Dedmon Center; Radford, VA
8	6:00 pm	No. 2 Winthrop vs. No. 3 Gardner–Webb	78-66	ESPN+
9	8:00 pm	No. 1 Radford vs. No. 5 Hampton	78–86	ESPN+
Championship - Sunday, March 8 at Winthrop Coliseum; Rock Hill, SC
10	1:00 pm	No. 5 Hampton vs. No. 2 Winthrop	68–76	ESPN
*Game times in ET. Rankings denote tournament seeding.

== Bracket ==
First round Tuesday, March 3 ESPN3
8	Charleston Southern	81
9	Presbyterian	64
7	USC Upstate	69
10	High Point	59
6	UNC Asheville	72
11	Campbell	68

Quarterfinals; Thursday, March 5 ESPN3
1	Radford	62
8	Charleston Southern	48
4	Longwood	53
5	Hampton	78
2	Winthrop	106
7	USC Upstate	70
3	Gardner–Webb	72
6	UNC Asheville	62

Semifinals; Friday, March 6 ESPN+
1	Radford	78
5	Hampton	86
2	Winthrop	78
3	Gardner–Webb	66

Championship; Sunday, March 8 ESPN
5	Hampton	68
2	Winthrop	76
