= 2019–20 High Point Panthers men's basketball team =

American college basketball season

2019–20 High Point Panthers men's basketball
- Conference: Big South Conference
- Record: 9–23 (6–12 Big South)
- Head coach: Tubby Smith (2nd season)
- Assistant coaches: G. G. Smith; Eric Grabriel; Keith Gatlin
- Home arena: Millis Athletic Center

2019–20 Big South men's basketball standings
	Conf.				Overall
Team	W		L	PCT	W		L	PCT
Radford	15	–	3	.833	21	–	11	.656
Winthrop†	15	–	3	.833	24	–	10	.706
Gardner–Webb	11	–	7	.611	16	–	16	.500
Longwood	9	–	9	.500	14	–	18	.438
Hampton	8	–	10	.444	15	–	19	.441
UNC Asheville	8	–	10	.444	15	–	16	.484
USC Upstate	7	–	11	.389	13	–	20	.394
Charleston Southern	7	–	11	.389	14	–	18	.438
Presbyterian	7	–	11	.389	10	–	22	.313
High Point	6	–	12	.333	9	–	23	.281
Campbell	6	–	12	.333	15	–	16	.484
† 2020 Big South tournament winner

The 2019–20 High Point Panthers men's basketball team represented High Point University in the 2019–20 NCAA Division I men's basketball season. The Panthers, led by second-year head coach Tubby Smith, played their home games at the Millis Athletic Convocation Center in High Point, North Carolina, as members of the Big South Conference. They finished the season 9–23, 6–12 in Big South play, to finish in a tie for tenth place. They lost in the first round of the Big South tournament to USC Upstate.

== Previous season ==
The Panthers finished the 2018–19 season 16–15 overall, 9–7 in Big South play, to finish in a tie for fifth place. In the Big South tournament, they were defeated by Gardner–Webb in the quarterfinals.

== Roster ==
2019–20 High Point Panthers men's basketball team
Players
Coaches

Pos.	#	Name	Height	Weight	Year	Hometown
G	1	John-Michael Wright	6 ft 1 in (1.85 m)	183 lb (83 kg)	Fr	Fayetteville, NC
G	2	Denny II Slay	5 ft 11 in (1.8 m)	193 lb (88 kg)	Jr	Woodbridge, VA
G	3	Jamal Wright	5 ft 11 in (1.8 m)	171 lb (78 kg)	Sr	Upper Marlboro, MD
G	4	Brendan Quinlan-Huertas	5 ft 11 in (1.8 m)	185 lb (84 kg)	Jr	Norwalk, CT
G	5	Curtis III Holland	6 ft 2 in (1.88 m)	222 lb (101 kg)	So	Churchton, MD
F/C	10	Emmanuel Izunabor	6 ft 9 in (2.06 m)	210 lb (95 kg)	Fr	Fayetteville, NC
G	11	Bryant Randleman	6 ft 4 in (1.93 m)	185 lb (84 kg)	Fr	Durham, NC
F	13	Cameron Billups	6 ft 3 in (1.91 m)	180 lb (82 kg)	Fr	Fayetteville, NC
C	14	Othello Smith	6 ft 10 in (2.08 m)	208 lb (94 kg)	RS Fr	Brooklyn, NY
F	15	Cliff Jr. Thomas	6 ft 8 in (2.03 m)	232 lb (105 kg)	Sr	Montgomery, AL
F	20	Eric Jr. Coleman	6 ft 8 in (2.03 m)	207 lb (94 kg)	Fr	Buford, GA
F	21	Ryan Ayers	6 ft 6 in (1.98 m)	205 lb (93 kg)	Fr	Clemmons, NC
F	22	Rob III Peterson	6 ft 4 in (1.93 m)	187 lb (85 kg)	So	Waxhaw, NC
G	32	John-Michael Hughes	6 ft 1 in (1.85 m)	165 lb (75 kg)	RS Fr	Ligonier, PA
F	35	Caden Sanchez	6 ft 8 in (2.03 m)	236 lb (107 kg)	RS So	Columbus, OH

Head coach

- Tubby Smith (High Point)

Assistant coach(es)

- G. G. Smith (Georgia)
- Eric Gabriel (West Liberty)
- Keith Gatlin (Maryland)

Legend

- (C) Team captain
- (S) Suspended
- (I) Ineligible
- (W) Walk-on
- Injured
- Current redshirt

Roster
Last update: January 25, 2020

== Schedule and results ==
Date time, TV	Rank^{#}	Opponent^{#}	Result	Record	Site (attendance) city, state
Exhibition
October 30, 2019*; 7:00 p.m.		Averett	W 79–68		Millis Center; High Point, NC
Non-conference regular season
November 5, 2019*; 7:00 p.m., ESPN+		William & Mary	L 56–70	0–1	Millis Center (1,292); High Point, NC
November 9, 2019*; 7:00 p.m., ESPN3		at Wofford	L 61–89	0–2	Jerry Richardson Indoor Stadium; Spartanburg, SC
November 13, 2019*; 7:00 p.m., ACCN		at Boston College; Gotham Classic	L 33–59	0–3	Conte Forum (4,710); Chestnut Hill, MA
November 18, 2019*; 7:30 p.m., ESPN+		at Belmont; Gotham Classic	L 61–90	0–4	Curb Event Center (1,556); Nashville, TN
November 20, 2019*; 7:00 p.m., FSMW		at Saint Louis; Gotham Classic	L 55–67	0–5	Chaifetz Arena (4,624); St. Louis, MO
November 23, 2019*; 2:00 p.m., ESPN+		Eastern Washington; Gotham Classic	L 74–90	0–6	Millis Center (874); High Point, NC
November 26, 2019*; 7:00 p.m., ESPN+		Greensboro	W 90–73	1–6	Millis Center (1,105); High Point, NC
December 2, 2019*; 7:00 p.m., ESPN+		at North Florida	L 70–93	1–7	UNF Arena (1,328); Jacksonville, FL
December 5, 2019*; 7:00 p.m., ESPN+		Elon	W 70–66 ^{OT}	2–7	Millis Center (1,831); High Point, NC
December 14, 2019*; 4:00 p.m.		at Florida Atlantic	L 64–81	2–8	FAU Arena (1,350); Boca Raton, FL
December 18, 2019*; 7:00 p.m., ESPN+		Valparaiso	L 72–87	2–9	Millis Center (928); High Point, NC
December 21, 2019*; 2:00 p.m., ESPN+		Belmont Abbey	W 92–66	3–9	Millis Center (974); High Point, NC
December 30, 2019*; 8:00 p.m., LHN		at Texas	L 58–89	3–10	Frank Erwin Center (8,652); Austin, TX
Big South Conference regular season
January 4, 2020; 4:30 p.m., ESPN+		at Radford	L 62–73	3–11 (0–1)	Dedmon Center (1,222); Radford, VA
January 8, 2020; 7:00 p.m., ESPN+		Winthrop	L 57–79	3–12 (0–2)	Millis Center (1,107); High Point, NC
January 11, 2020; 4:00 p.m., ESPN+		at Presbyterian	L 62–77	3–13 (0–3)	Templeton Physical Education Center (482); Clinton, SC
January 16, 2020; 6:00 p.m., ESPN+		at UNC Asheville	W 68–66	4–13 (1–3)	Kimmel Arena (1,176); Asheville, NC
January 18, 2020; 2:00 p.m., ESPN3		Charleston Southern	L 60–79	4–14 (1–4)	Millis Center (1,272); High Point, NC
January 20, 2020; 6:00 p.m., ESPN+		at USC Upstate	W 70–62	5–14 (2–4)	G. B. Hodge Center (535); Spartanburg, SC
January 23, 2020; 7:00 p.m., ESPN+		Gardner–Webb	L 76–79 ^{OT}	5–15 (2–5)	Millis Center (1,094); High Point, NC
January 25, 2020; 7:00 p.m., ESPN+		Longwood	L 62–72	5–16 (2–6)	Millis Center (1,408); High Point, NC
January 30, 2020; 7:00 p.m., ESPN+		at Campbell	W 62–57	6–16 (3–6)	Gore Arena (2,137); Buies Creek, NC
February 6, 2020; 7:00 p.m., ESPN+		Hampton	W 88–85	7–16 (4–6)	Millis Center (811); High Point, NC
February 8, 2020; 7:00 p.m., ESPN+		Radford	L 70–81	7–17 (4–7)	Millis Center (1,258); High Point, NC
February 10, 2020; 7:00 p.m., ESPN3		at Gardner–Webb	L 55–86	7–18 (4–8)	Paul Porter Arena (1,150); Boiling Springs, NC
February 13, 2020; 7:30 p.m., ESPN+		at Charleston Southern	L 63–66	7–19 (4–9)	CSU Field House (693); North Charleston, SC
February 15, 2020; 7:00 p.m., ESPN+		USC Upstate	W 62–54	8–19 (5–9)	Millis Center (1,638); High Point, NC
February 20, 2020; 7:00 p.m., ESPN+		Presbyterian	W 82–70	9–19 (6–9)	Millis Center (1,051); High Point, NC
February 22, 2020; 7:00 p.m., ESPN+		at Longwood	L 54–57	9–20 (6–10)	Willett Hall (1,672); Farmville, VA
February 27, 2020; 7:00 p.m., ESPN+		UNC Asheville	L 76–80	9–21 (6–11)	Millis Center (1,204); High Point, NC
February 29, 2020; 1:00 p.m., ESPN+		at Winthrop	L 76–84	9–22 (6–12)	Winthrop Coliseum (2,523); Rock Hill, SC
Big South tournament
March 3, 2020; 7:00 p.m., ESPN3	(10)	at (7) USC Upstate; First round	L 59–69	9–23	G. B. Hodge Center (765); Spartanburg, SC
*Non-conference game. ^{#}Rankings from AP poll. (#) Tournament seedings in parentheses. All times are in Eastern.
