= Hampton Convocation Center =

Arena in Hampton, Virginia

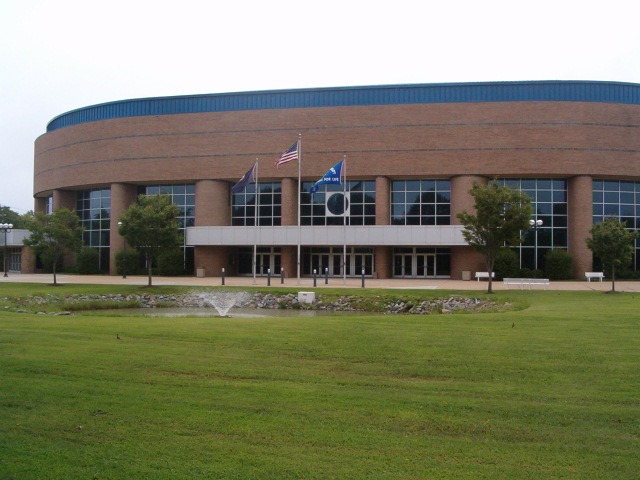
- Hampton Convocation Center from the outside
- Interactive map of Hampton Convocation Center
- Location: 100 East Queen Street; Hampton, VA 23668
- Coordinates: 37.01974°N 76.33108°W
- Owner: Hampton University
- Operator: Hampton University
- Capacity: 8,200; 7,200 (basketball)
- Surface: Hardwood

Construction
- Groundbreaking: February 1992
- Opened: September 12, 1993
- Cost: $12.5 million ($27.9 million in 2025 dollars)
- Architects: The Livas Group Architects, P.C.
- Project manager: ArmadaHoffler Construction Co.

Tenants
- Hampton Pirates (NCAA) (1993–present)

Hampton Convocation Center is a 7,200-seat multi-purpose arena in Hampton, Virginia. It was built in 1993 and is home to the Hampton University Pirates basketball team. The arena replaced Holland Hall gymnasium, which holds women's volleyball matches and tournaments. The construction cost was about $4 million–$5 million.

== See also ==
- List of NCAA Division I basketball arenas
