= Winthrop Coliseum =

Arena in Rock Hill, South Carolina, United States

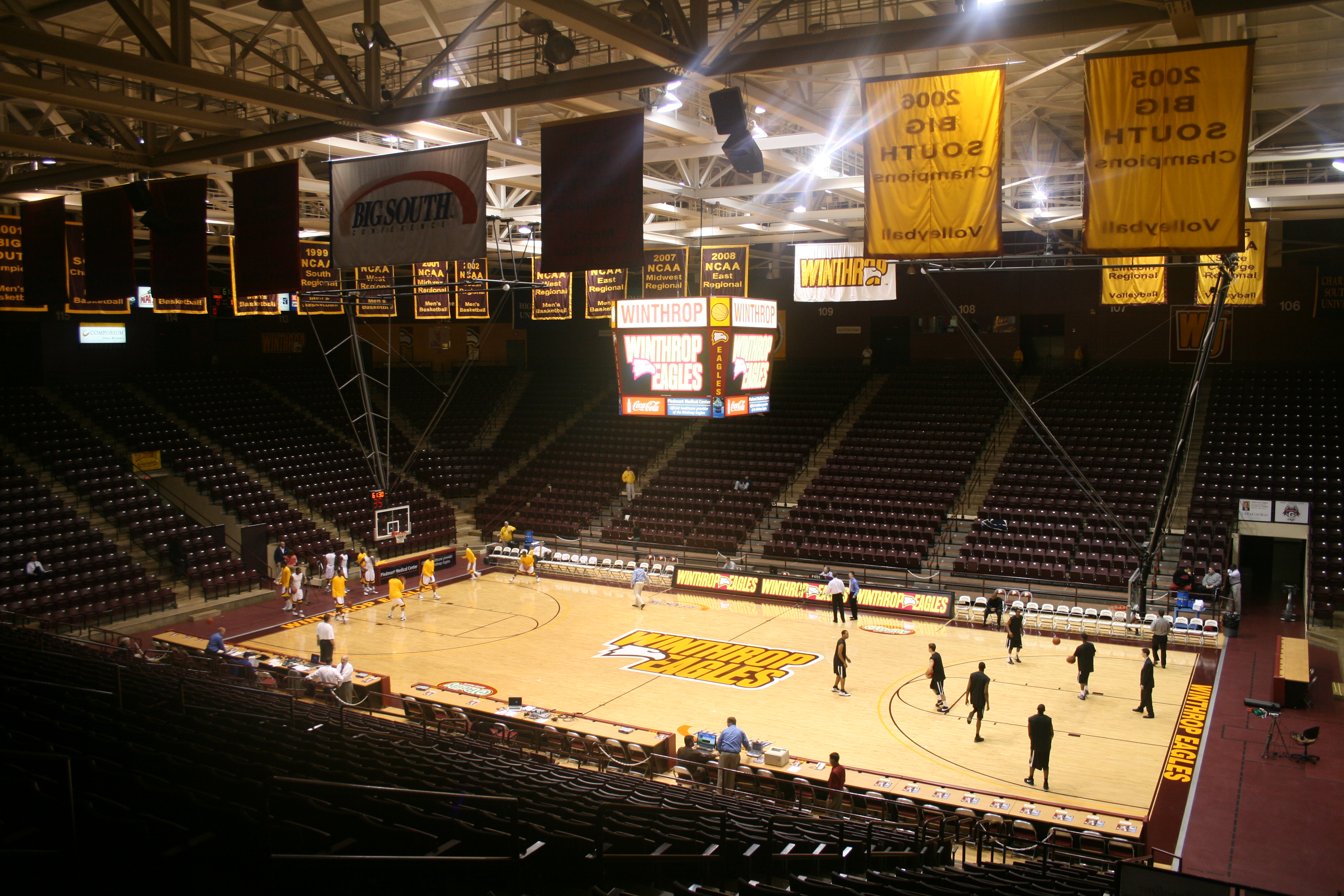
- Interactive map of Winthrop Coliseum
- Location: 1162 Eden Terrace; Rock Hill, South Carolina 29730
- Coordinates: 34°56′52.48″N 81°00′53.90″W
- Owner: Winthrop University
- Operator: Winthrop University
- Capacity: 6,100
- Surface: Hardwood

Construction
- Opened: October 1982; 43 years ago
- Cost: $10.7 million ($37.9 million in 2025 dollars)

Tenants
- Winthrop Eagles men's basketball Winthrop Eagles women's basketball Winthrop Eagles women's volleyball

Winthrop Coliseum is a 6,100-seat multi-purpose arena in Rock Hill, South Carolina. It was built in 1982 and is home to the Winthrop University Eagles basketball and volleyball teams.

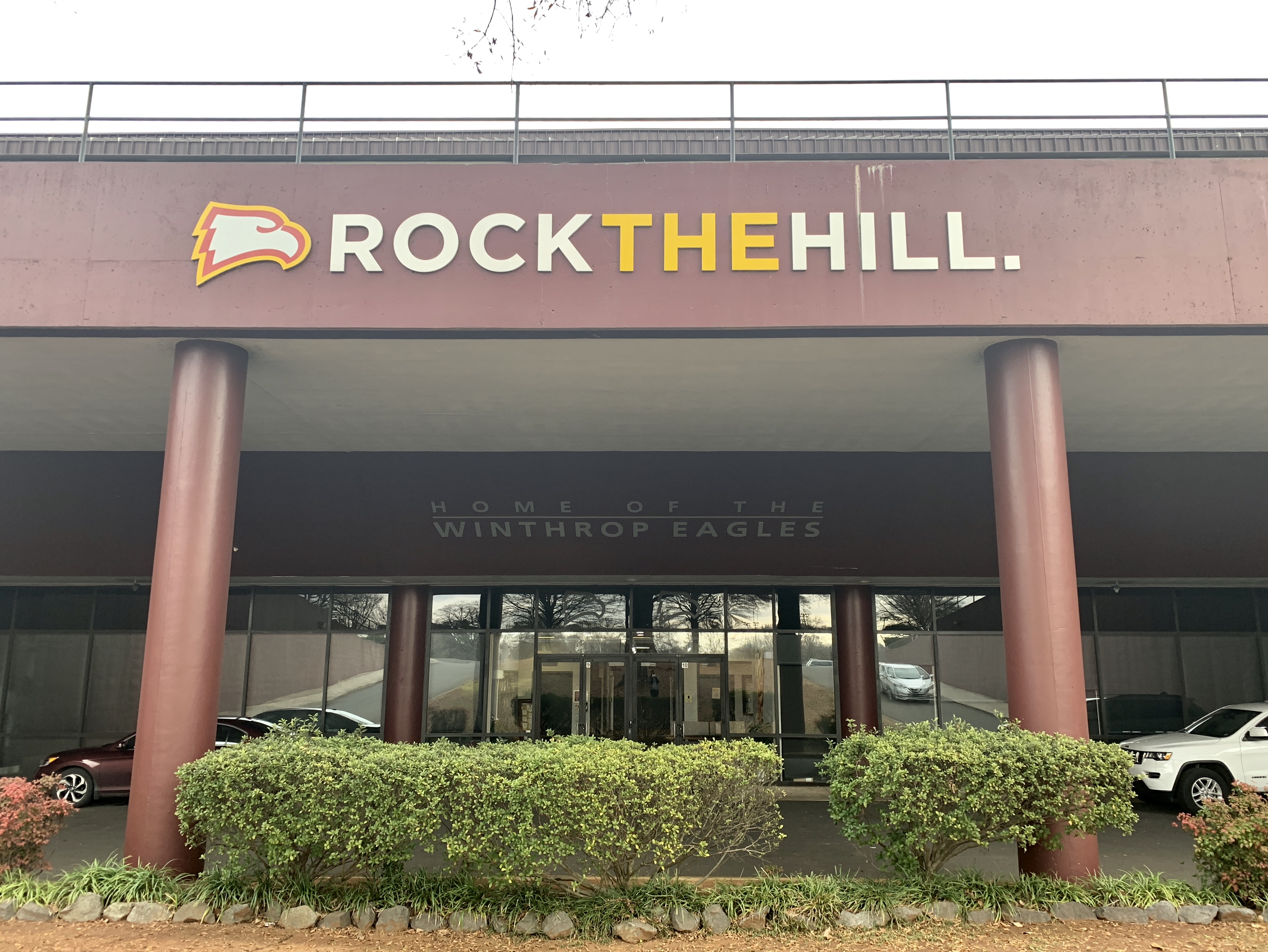
Winthrop Coliseum

The facility accommodates conventions, trade shows, concerts, special events, and other sporting tournaments.

== Special events ==
In 2015, a Democratic presidential candidate forum featuring Hillary Clinton, Bernie Sanders, and Martin O'Malley was scheduled to take place at the coliseum but was later moved to an alternative location on Winthrop University's campus. In 2016, then presidential candidate, Donald Trump held a rally at the Winthrop Coliseum. During the rally, a Muslim American woman who stood in silent protest was removed by police. The event sparked controversy and gained national media attention. In fall 2019, Canadian pop and r&b singer Alessia Cara (who won a Grammy for Best New Artist in 2018) was scheduled to perform at the Coliseum for part of her The Pains of Growing Tour. However, the concert was cancelled due to low ticket sales. In 1988, Sir Mix-A-Lot, Rob Base, and Kid n' Play performed a concert at the Coliseum. In 1983, Jimmy Buffett performed at the Coliseum for only $13.00.

== See also ==
- List of NCAA Division I basketball arenas
