= Dedmon Center =

Arena in Radford, Virginia, U.S.

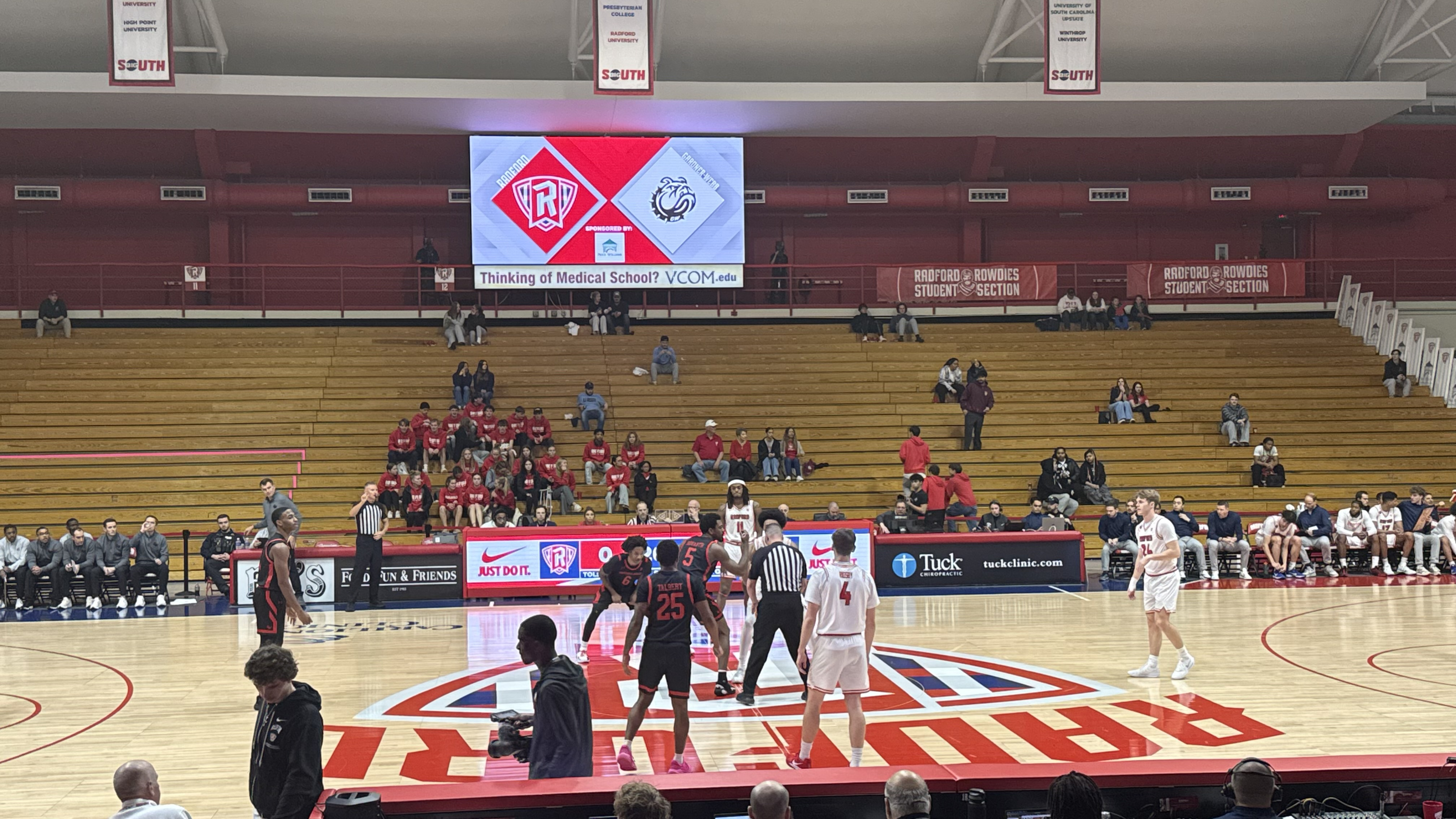
- A basketball game at the Dedmon Center in 2026
- Interactive map of Dedmon Center
- Location: 101 University Drive; Radford, VA 24141
- Coordinates: 37.1386°N 80.541769°W
- Owner: Radford University
- Operator: Radford University
- Capacity: Basketball: 3,205; Volleyball: 1,000
- Surface: Hardwood

Construction
- Opened: 1981

Tenants
- Radford men's and women's basketball Radford women's volleyball

The Dedmon Center is a 3,800-seat multi-purpose arena in Radford, Virginia. Construction started in 1979 and finished in 1981. A natatorium featuring an eight-lane olympic-size pool with a diving well was added in 1987. The Dedmon Center is home to the Radford University Highlanders basketball team. The center is named for Dr. Donald Dedmon, who served as president of Radford University from 1972 until 1995 when he retired. It was the tenth air-supported roof built in the United States. The air-supported fabric roof was removed during a major renovation in April 2008 and replaced with a fabric roof supported by steel trusses.

The Dedmon Center reopened on January 21, 2009, with a new lights system, sound system, and a new basketball floor. The venue hosted the final of the 2009 Big South Conference men's basketball tournament and the final of the 2018 and 2019 Big South Conference men's tournament.

The Dedmon Center also houses the athletic department's new Learning Enhancement Center (LEC), dedicated to student-athlete support services and a state-of-the-art, 5,000-square-foot (460 m^{2}) weight room dedicated to the needs of the university's 16 varsity athletic teams. The complex features several adjoining facilities, including intramural soccer, football and softball fields and intercollegiate fields and courts for baseball, softball, field hockey, Lacrosse, and tennis. In addition the Patrick D. Cupp Stadium adds an intercollegiate soccer and track and field complex.

== See also ==
- List of NCAA Division I basketball arenas
