= Charleston Southern Buccaneers men's basketball statistical leaders =

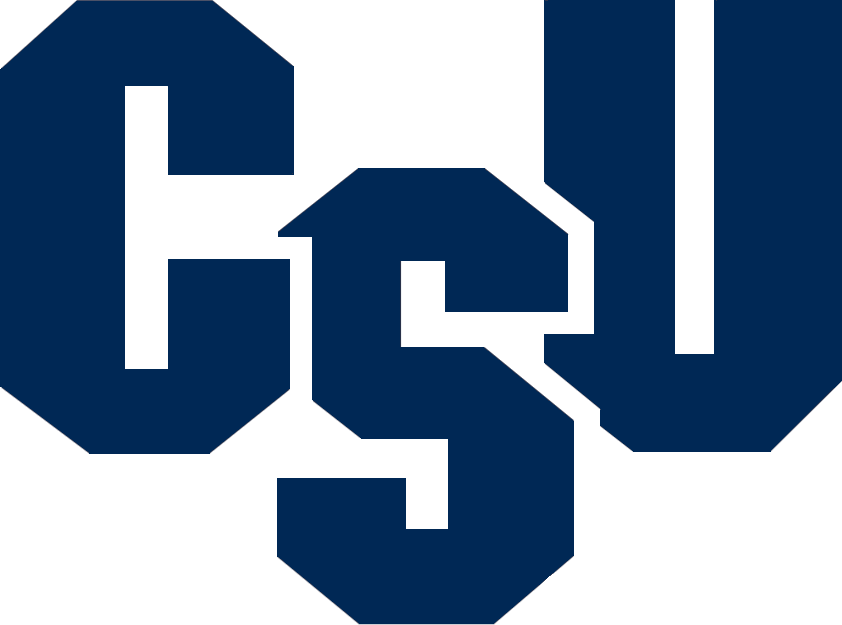

The Charleston Southern Buccaneers men's basketball statistical leaders are individual statistical leaders of the Charleston Southern Buccaneers men's basketball program in various categories, including points, rebounds, assists, steals, and blocks. Within those areas, the lists identify single-game, single-season, and career leaders. The Buccaneers represent Charleston Southern University in the NCAA's Big South Conference.

Charleston Southern began competing in intercollegiate basketball in 1965. The NCAA did not officially record assists as a stat until the 1983–84 season, and blocks and steals until the 1985–86 season, but Charleston Southern's record books includes players in these stats before these seasons. These lists are updated through the end of the 2020–21 season.

== Scoring ==
Career
Rk	Player	Points	Seasons
1	Ben Hinson	2295	1983–84 1984–85 1985–86 1986–87
2	Jamarco Warren	1968	2007–08 2008–09 2009–10 2010–11
3	Saah Nimley	1866	2011–12 2012–13 2013–14 2014–15
4	Brett Larrick	1738	1993–94 1994–95 1995–96 1996–97
5	Taje' Kelly	1686	2021–22 2022–23 2023–24 2024–25
6	Christian Keeling	1666	2016–17 2017–18 2018–19
7	Arlon Harper	1633	2011–12 2012–13 2013–14 2014–15
8	Marion Salerni	1557	1965–66 1966–67 1967–68 1968–69
9	T. L. Latson	1518	1992–93 1993–94 1994–95 1995–96
10	Phlandrous Fleming	1510	2017–18 2018–19 2019–20 2020–21

Season
Rk	Player	Points	Season
1	Marion Salerni	688	1968–69
2	Ben Hinson	677	1986–87
3	Saah Nimley	663	2014–15
4	Taje' Kelly	636	2024–25
5	Christian Keeling	635	2018–19
6	Darnell Sneed	622	1992–93
7	Darnell Sneed	618	1991–92
8	Robert Thomas	615	1972–73
9	Eric Burks	612	1994–95
10	Ben Hinson	606	1984–85

Single game
Rk	Player	Points	Season	Opponent
1	Marion Salerni	52	1968–69	Wofford
2	Ben Hinson	43	1984–85	Edward Waters
	Dwayne Jackson	43	2006–07	VMI
4	Brycen Blaine	42	2025–26	The Citadel
5	Darnell Sneed	40	1992–93	Allen
6	Marion Salerni	39	1968–69	Florida Tech
	Jim Rooney	39	1969–70	CofC
	Ben Hinson	39	1986–87	Bethune-Cookman
	Darnell Sneed	39	1992–93	UMBC
	Saah Nimley	39	2014–15	Radford
	Anthony Ruffolo	39	2026–27	West Georgia

== Rebounds ==
Career
Rk	Player	Rebounds	Seasons
1	Dan Franz	1258	1967–68 1968–69 1969–70 1970–71
2	Kelvin Martin	968	2008–09 2009–10 2010–11 2011–12
3	Bo Jamison	797	1968–69 1969–70 1970–71 1971–72
4	Taje' Kelly	796	2021–22 2022–23 2023–24 2024–25
5	Heder Ambroise	785	1985–86 1986–87 1987–88 1988–89
6	Doug Shanklin	777	1969–70 1970–71 1971–72 1972–73
7	Paul Gombwer	775	2011–12 2012–13 2013–14 2014–15
8	Jim Hansen	746	1966–67 1967–68 1968–69 1969–70
9	Dave Kirk	736	1970–71 1971–72 1972–73 1973–74
10	T. L. Latson	704	1992–93 1993–94 1994–95 1995–96

Season
Rk	Player	Rebounds	Season
1	Dan Franz	390	1969–70
2	Robert Thomas	341	1972–73
3	Dan Franz	339	1967–68
	Dan Franz	339	1970–71
5	Oliver Johnson	331	1987–88
6	Marion Salerni	327	1968–69
7	Jim Gardner	310	1966–67
8	Doug Shanklin	306	1972–73
9	Kelvin Martin	281	2011–12
10	Phlandrous Fleming	278	2019–20

Single game
Rk	Player	Rebounds	Season	Opponent
1	Dan Franz	30	1967–68	UNCW

== Assists ==
Career
Rk	Player	Assists	Seasons
1	Saah Nimley	511	2011–12 2012–13 2013–14 2014–15
2	Ed O'Neil	504	2000–01 2001–02 2002–03 2003–04
3	Errol McPherson	403	1993–94 1994–95 1995–96 1996–97
4	Marcus Beasley	381	1981–82 1982–83 1983–84 1984–85
5	Tony Fairley	379	1985–86 1986–87
6	Jimmy Howell	372	1974–75 1975–76 1976–77
7	Jamarco Warren	336	2007–08 2008–09 2009–10 2010–11
8	Ben Hinson	303	1983–84 1984–85 1985–86 1986–87
9	Brett Larrick	296	1993–94 1994–95 1995–96 1996–97
10	RJ Johnson	294	2022–23 2023–24 2024–25

Season
Rk	Player	Assists	Season
1	Tony Fairley	270	1986–87
2	Ed O'Neil	162	2003–04
3	Marcus Beasley	157	1983–84
4	Saah Nimley	151	2012–13
5	Donnell Covington	149	2006–07
6	John Kammeyer	144	1972–73
7	Eric McClellon	139	1985–86
8	Jimmy Howell	135	1975–76
9	Jimmy Howell	133	1976–77
	Errol McPherson	133	1995–96

Single game
Rk	Player	Assists	Season	Opponent
1	Tony Fairley	22	1986–87	Armstrong State
2	Tony Fairley	20	1986–87	Coastal Carolina
3	Tony Fairley	16	1986–87	Campbell
4	Roger White	15	1969–70	Wofford

== Steals ==
Career
Rk	Player	Steals	Seasons
1	Ed O'Neil	241	2000–01 2001–02 2002–03 2003–04
2	Arlon Harper	226	2011–12 2012–13 2013–14 2014–15
3	Kelvin Martin	221	2008–09 2009–10 2010–11 2011–12
4	Tony Fairley	184	1985–86 1986–87
5	Brett Larrick	181	1993–94 1994–95 1995–96 1996–97
6	Heder Ambroise	161	1985–86 1986–87 1987–88 1988–89
7	Jamarco Warren	153	2007–08 2008–09 2009–10 2010–11
8	David Oliver	150	1987–88 1988–89 1989–90 1990–91
	Nick Mitchell	150	1997–98 1998–99 1999–00 2000–01
10	Errol McPherson	145	1993–94 1994–95 1995–96 1996–97

Season
Rk	Player	Steals	Season
1	Tony Fairley	114	1986–87
2	Tony Fairley	70	1985–86
3	Eric Burks	69	1993–94
4	Ed O'Neil	66	2002–03
5	Kelvin Martin	65	2011–12
6	Kelvin Martin	64	2009–10
7	Ed O'Neil	63	2003–04
	Arlon Harper	63	2011–12
	Arlon Harper	63	2012–13
10	Adam Larrick	61	1998–99

Single game
Rk	Player	Steals	Season	Opponent
1	Tony Fairley	10	1986–87	UNC Asheville
	Tony Fairley	10	1986–87	Armstrong State
3	Tony Fairley	9	1985–86	Delaware State
	Ed O'Neil	9	2003–04	Coastal Carolina
5	Tony Fairley	8	1986–87	Allen
	Heder Ambroise	8	1987–88	UMES
	Errol McPherson	8	1993–94	Warner Southern
8	Randall Slawson	7	1983–84	Alabama State
	Tony Fairley	7	1985–86	Judson
	Tony Fairley	7	1986–87	Voorhees
	Heder Ambroise	7	1987–88	Claflin
	Matt Cunningham	7	1992–93	Towson
	Jeff Daniels	7	1995–96	The Citadel
	Ed O'Neil	7	2002–03	High Point
	Kelvin Martin	7	2011–12	Stetson

== Blocks ==
Career
Rk	Player	Blocks	Seasons
1	Kelvin Martin	127	2008–09 2009–10 2010–11 2011–12
2	Reis Jones	100	2024–25 2025–26
3	Nick Mitchell	96	1997–98 1998–99 1999–00 2000–01
4	Phlandrous Fleming	89	2017–18 2018–19 2019–20 2020–21
5	Ferdinand Cain	69	2002–03 2003–04 2004–05 2005–06
6	Chad Kartchner	68	1994–95 1995–96
7	Alhaji Fullah	66	2012–13 2013–14
8	Nikola Pejovic	63	1999–00 2000–01 2001–02
9	Darryl Hall	60	1987–88 1988–89 1989–90 1990–91
	Trent Drafts	60	2001–02 2002–03 2003–04 2005–06

Season
Rk	Player	Blocks	Season
1	Reis Jones	59	2025–26
2	Stacy Wilson	57	1990–91
3	Kelvin Martin	51	2011–12
4	Lase Olalere	48	2025–26
5	Phlandrous Fleming	47	2019–20
6	Alhaji Fullah	43	2012–13
7	Reis Jones	41	2024–25
8	Nick Mitchell	39	1999–00
9	Ferdinand Cain	36	2005–06
	Jordan Jones	36	2017–18

Single game
Rk	Player	Blocks	Season	Opponent
1	Stacy Wilson	7	1990–91	College of Charleston
2	Kelvin Martin	6	2008–09	Cincinnati
	Phlandrous Fleming	6	2019–20	Gardner-Webb
4	Stacy Wilson	5	1990–91	Methodist
	Stacy Wilson	5	1990–91	Providence
	Nick Mitchell	5	1999–00	Liberty
	Nikola Pejovic	5	2001–02	North Greenville
	Jovan Jegdic	5	2004–05	Brown
	Kelvin Martin	5	2011–12	Bluefield
	Kelvin Martin	5	2011–12	Radford
	Alhaji Fullah	5	2012–13	Liberty
	Devin Brafford	5	2025–26	Winthrop
	Lase Olalere	5	2025–26	High Point
	Lase Olalere	5	2025–26	Longwood
