= 2011–12 Gardner–Webb Runnin' Bulldogs men's basketball team =

American college basketball season

2011–12 Gardner–Webb Runnin' Bulldogs men's basketball
- Conference: Big South Conference
- Record: 12–20 (6–12 Big South)
- Head coach: Chris Holtmann (2nd season)
- Assistant coaches: Takayo Siddle (2nd season); Mike Netti (2nd season); Jay McAuley (2nd season)
- Home arena: Paul Porter Arena

2011–12 Big South men's basketball standings
	Conf.				Overall
Team	W		L	PCT	W		L	PCT
UNC Asheville†	16	–	2	.889	24	–	10	.706
Coastal Carolina	12	–	6	.667	19	–	12	.613
Campbell	11	–	7	.611	17	–	15	.531
Charleston Southern	11	–	7	.611	19	–	12	.613
Liberty	9	–	9	.500	15	–	17	.469
Winthrop	8	–	10	.444	12	–	20	.375
VMI	8	–	10	.444	17	–	16	.515
High Point	8	–	10	.444	13	–	18	.419
Presbyterian*	8	–	10	.444	14	–	15	.483
Gardner–Webb	6	–	12	.333	12	–	20	.375
Radford	2	–	16	.111	6	–	26	.188
† 2012 Big South tournament winner As of March 15, 2012; Rankings from AP Poll; *Ineligible for conference tournament

The 2011–12 Gardner–Webb Runnin' Bulldogs men's basketball team represented Gardner–Webb University during the 2011–12 NCAA Division I men's basketball season. Their head coach was Chris Holtmann. The Runnin' Bulldogs played their home games at the Paul Porter Arena and are members of the Big South Conference. They finished the season 12–20, 6–12 in Big South play to finish in tenth place and lost in the first round of the Big South tournament to High Point.

== Roster ==
2011–12 Gardner–Webb Runnin' Bulldogs men's basketball team
Players
Coaches

Pos.	#	Name	Height	Weight	Year	Hometown
G/F	0	Donta Harper	6 ft 6 in (1.98 m)	180 lb (82 kg)	Fr	Winterville, NC
G	2	Jay Royster	6 ft 0 in (1.83 m)	175 lb (79 kg)	Jr	Shelby, NC
G	3	David Brown	6 ft 2 in (1.88 m)	180 lb (82 kg)	Sr	Margate, FL
G	4	Tyler Strange	5 ft 9 in (1.75 m)	175 lb (79 kg)	Fr	Worcester, MA
F	5	Stefon Johnson	6 ft 6 in (1.98 m)	215 lb (98 kg)	Jr	Cincinnati, OH
G	10	Max Landis	6 ft 1 in (1.85 m)	175 lb (79 kg)	Fr	Indianapolis, IN
G	11	Jason Dawson	5 ft 10 in (1.78 m)	175 lb (79 kg)	RS Jr	Columbus, OH
G	15	Laron Buggs	6 ft 1 in (1.85 m)	180 lb (82 kg)	Sr	Tulsa, OK
G	23	Jarvis Davis	6 ft 0 in (1.83 m)	180 lb (82 kg)	So	Columbia, SC
F	24	Kevin Hartley	6 ft 6 in (1.98 m)	235 lb (107 kg)	Jr	Klein, TX
G	30	Jamal Mitchell	6 ft 3 in (1.91 m)	280 lb (127 kg)	So	Charlotte, NC
F	31	Santoine Butler	6 ft 7 in (2.01 m)	210 lb (95 kg)	So	Hepzibah, GA
G	32	Tashan Newsome	6 ft 3 in (1.91 m)	200 lb (91 kg)	Jr	Albany, NY
F	33	Corey Hensley	6 ft 8 in (2.03 m)	220 lb (100 kg)	Fr	Candler, NC
G	35	Kyle Dennis	6 ft 1 in (1.85 m)	165 lb (75 kg)	Fr	Madison, AL
C	54	Mike Byron	6 ft 11 in (2.11 m)	250 lb (113 kg)	So	San Antonio, TX

Head coach

- Chris Holtmann (Taylor)

Assistant coach(es)

- Takayo Siddle (Gardner–Webb)
- Mike Netti (Syracuse)
- Jay McAuley (Georgia)

Legend

- (C) Team captain
- (S) Suspended
- (I) Ineligible
- (W) Walk-on
- Injured
- Current redshirt

Roster
Last update: 2011-10-31

Source: 2011–12 Gardner-Webb Men's Basketball Roster

== Schedule ==
Date time, TV	Opponent	Result	Record	Site city, state
Regular season
Nov. 11*; 8:00 pm	at Clemson	L 44–65	0–1	Littlejohn Coliseum; Clemson, SC
Nov. 13*; 7:15 pm	at Lipscomb	W 74–71	1–1	Allen Arena; Nashville, TN
Nov. 16*; 7:00 pm	Lees–McRae	W 91–61	2–1	Paul Porter Arena; Boiling Springs, NC
Nov. 19*; 7:00 pm	at South Carolina State	L 68–73	2–2	SHM Memorial Center; Orangeburg, SC
Nov. 21*; 7:00 pm	at Indiana; Hoosier Invitational	L 49–73	2–3	Assembly Hall; Bloomington, IN
Nov. 23*; 7:00 pm	at Butler; Hoosier Invitational	L 66–68	2–4	Hinkle Fieldhouse; Indianapolis, IN
Nov. 26*; 5:00 pm	vs. Savannah State	L 66–72	2–5	McKenzie Arena; Chattanooga, TN
Nov. 27*; 3:00 pm	at Chattanooga; Hoosier Invitational	W 76–74 ^{OT}	3–5	McKenzie Arena; Chattanooga, TN
Dec. 01; 5:30 pm	UNC Asheville	L 60–66	3–6 (0–1)	Paul Porter Arena; Boiling Springs, NC
Dec. 03; 7:00 pm	Winthrop	W 62–60	4–6 (1–1)	Paul Porter Arena; Boiling Springs, NC
Dec. 06*; 7:00 pm	Alice Lloyd	W 87–57	5–6	Paul Porter Arena; Boiling Springs, NC
Dec. 10*; 7:00 pm	South Carolina State	W 87–57	6–6	Paul Porter Arena; Boiling Springs, NC
Dec. 18*; 1:00 pm	at Wake Forest	L 59–67	6–7	LJVM Coliseum; Winston-Salem, NC
Dec. 22*; 7:00 pm	at East Carolina	L 55–69	6–8	Williams Arena at Minges Coliseum; Greenville, NC
Dec. 31; 2:00 pm	at Radford	W 61–55	7–8 (2–1)	Dedmon Center; Radford, VA
Jan. 02; 1:00 pm	at VMI	L 72–76	7–9 (2–2)	Cameron Hall; Lexington, VA
Jan. 07; 7:00 pm	High Point	W 65–61 ^{OT}	8–9 (3–2)	Paul Porter Arena; Boiling Springs, NC
Jan. 10; 7:00 pm	Charleston Southern	W 80–77	9–9 (4–2)	Paul Porter Arena; Boiling Springs, NC
Jan. 12; 7:00 pm	at Coastal Carolina	L 63–65	9–10 (4–3)	Kimbel Arena; Conway, SC
Jan. 14; 1:00 pm	at Campbell	L 68–74	9–11 (4–4)	Pope Convocation Center; Buies Creek, NC
Jan. 19; 7:00 pm	at Winthrop	L 54–56	9–12 (4–5)	Winthrop Coliseum; Rock Hill, SC
Jan. 26; 7:00 pm	Campbell	W 78–72	10–12 (5–5)	Paul Porter Arena; Boiling Springs, NC
Jan. 28; 7:00 pm	Coastal Carolina	L 56–70	10–13 (5–6)	Paul Porter Arena; Boiling Springs, NC
Feb. 2; 7:00 pm	at Liberty	L 58–63	10–14 (5–7)	Vines Center; Lynchburg, VA
Feb. 04; 7:00 pm	at High Point	W 81–77 ^{OT}	10–15 (5–8)	Millis Center; High Point, NC
Feb. 09; 7:00 pm	Radford	L 54–58	10–16 (5–9)	Paul Porter Arena; Boiling Springs, NC
Feb. 11; 7:00 pm	VMI	W 77–61	11–16 (6–9)	Paul Porter Arena; Boiling Springs, NC
Feb. 14; 7:30 pm	at Charleston Southern	L 58–73	11–17 (6–10)	CSU Field House; Charleston, SC
Feb. 18*; 7:00 pm	Delaware State; ESPN BracketBusters	W 57–56	12–17	Paul Porter Arena; Boiling Springs, NC
Feb. 23; 7:00 pm	at UNC Asheville	L 61–71	12–18 (6–11)	Kimmel Arena; Asheville, NC
Feb. 25; 7:00 pm	Presbyterian	L 62–68	12–19 (6–12)	Paul Porter Arena; Boiling Springs, NC
Big South Conference tournament
Feb. 27; 8:00 pm	at High Point; First Round	L 58–68	12–20	Millis Center; High Point, NC
*Non-conference game. ^{#}Rankings from Coaches' Poll. (#) Tournament seedings in parentheses. All times are in Eastern Time..

Source: 2011–12 Gardner-Webb Men's Basketball Schedule
