= 2011–12 Charleston Southern Buccaneers men's basketball team =

American college basketball season

2011–12 Charleston Southern Buccaneers men's basketball
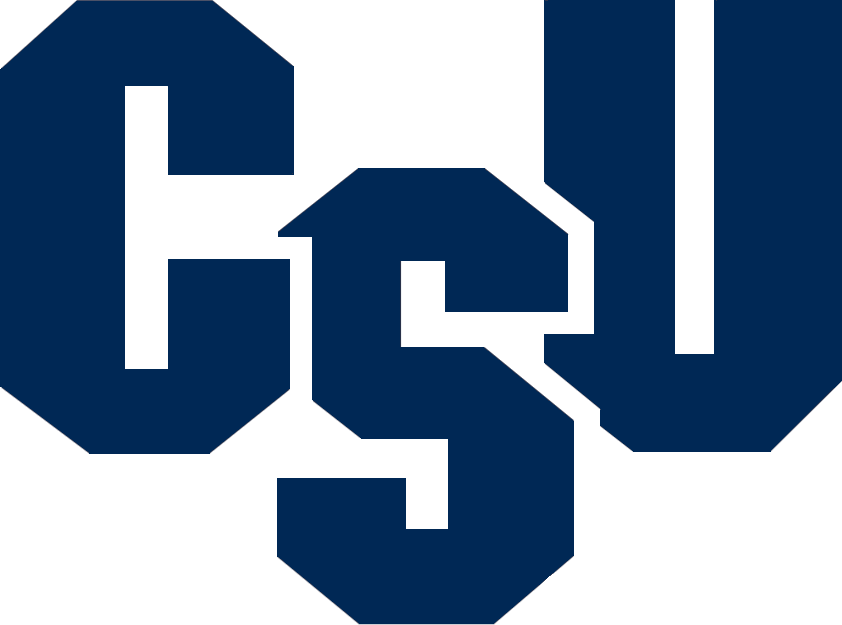
- Conference: Big South Conference
- Record: 19–12 (11–7 Big South)
- Head coach: Barclay Radebaugh (7th season)
- Assistant coaches: BJ McKie; Ahmad Smith; Brad Dobbels
- Home arena: CSU Field House

2011–12 Big South men's basketball standings
	Conf.				Overall
Team	W		L	PCT	W		L	PCT
UNC Asheville†	16	–	2	.889	24	–	10	.706
Coastal Carolina	12	–	6	.667	19	–	12	.613
Campbell	11	–	7	.611	17	–	15	.531
Charleston Southern	11	–	7	.611	19	–	12	.613
Liberty	9	–	9	.500	15	–	17	.469
Winthrop	8	–	10	.444	12	–	20	.375
VMI	8	–	10	.444	17	–	16	.515
High Point	8	–	10	.444	13	–	18	.419
Presbyterian*	8	–	10	.444	14	–	15	.483
Gardner–Webb	6	–	12	.333	12	–	20	.375
Radford	2	–	16	.111	6	–	26	.188
† 2012 Big South tournament winner As of March 15, 2012; Rankings from AP Poll; *Ineligible for conference tournament

The 2011–12 Charleston Southern Buccaneers men's basketball team represented Charleston Southern University during the 2011–12 NCAA Division I men's basketball season. The Buccaneers, led by seventh year head coach Barclay Radebaugh, played their home games at CSU Field House and are members of the Big South Conference. They finished the season 19–12, 11–7 in Big South play to finish in a tie for third place. They lost in the semifinals of the Big South Basketball tournament to UNC Asheville. Despite having 19 wins, they did not accept an invitation to a post season tournament.

== Roster ==
Number	Name	Position	Height	Weight	Year	Hometown
0	Arlon Harper	Guard	6–1	170	Freshman	College Park, Georgia
1	Kelvin Martin	Forward	6–5	207	Senior	Adel, Georgia
4	Sheldon Strickland	Guard	6–0	180	Sophomore	Lithonia, Georgia
5	Saah Nimley	Guard	5–8	155	Freshman	Lawrenceville, Georgia
10	Jeremy Sexton	Guard	6–2	175	Junior	Chattanooga, Tennessee
11	Matt Kennedy	Guard	6–3	175	Sophomore	Charleston, South Carolina
12	Mitchell Deter	Guard	6–3	190	Sophomore	Columbia, South Carolina
14	Joe Williams	Forward	6–5	195	Junior	Crescent, Georgia
15	Paul Gombwer	Forward	6–6	215	Freshman	Kaduna, Nigeria
20	Chris Grier	Guard	6–3	175	Sophomore	Decatur, Georgia
23	Mathiang Muo	Forward	6–5	217	Junior	Sydney, Australia
24	Cedrick Bowen	Forward	6–5	225	Freshman	Woodstock, Georgia
30	Thomas Odom	Guard	6–3	170	Sophomore	Florence, South Carolina
33	Greg Dorleus	Forward	6–9	249	Freshman	Oviedo, Florida
42	Harrison Bowne	Forward	6–6	225	Freshman	Hickory, North Carolina

== Schedule ==
Date time, TV	Rank^{#}	Opponent^{#}	Result	Record	Site (attendance) city, state
Regular season
11/11/2011*; 8:00 pm, FSKC		at Kansas State	L 67–72	0–1	Bramlage Coliseum (12,528); Manhattan, KS
11/13/2011*; 4:00 pm		at Wichita State	L 57–85	0–2	Charles Koch Arena (10,181); Wichita, KS
11/15/2011*; 7:30 pm		Bluefield	W 88–64	1–2	CSU Field House (795); Charleston, SC
11/19/2011*; 8:00 pm		Milligan	W 89–59	2–2	CSU Field House (915); Charleston, SC
11/21/2011*; 7:30 pm		Stetson	W 73–64	3–2	CSU Field House (891); Charleston, SC
12/01/2011; 7:30 pm		Radford	W 83–73	4–2 (1–0)	CSU Field House (911); Charleston, SC
12/03/2011; 5:30 pm		VMI	W 114–81	5–2 (2–0)	CSU Field House (872); Charleston, SC
12/05/2011*; 7:00 pm, ESPNU		at Florida State	L 51–76	5–3	Donald L. Tucker Center (6,316); Tallahassee, FL
12/14/2011*; 7:00 pm		at The Citadel	W 88–69	6–3	McAlister Field House (1,129); Charleston, SC
12/17/2011*; 6:00 pm		at College of Charleston	L 68–70	6–4	TD Arena (3,765); Charleston, SC
12/21/2011*; 7:00 pm		at Stetson	W 88–81	7–4	Edmunds Center (1,035); DeLand, FL
12/28/2011*; 7:30 pm		Erskine	W 96–69	8–4	CSU Field House (1,049); Charleston, SC
12/31/2011; 2:00 pm		at Liberty	W 81–76	9–4 (3–0)	Randolph College Gym (358); Lynchburg, VA
01/02/2012; 7:00 pm		at High Point	L 78–88	9–5 (3–1)	Millis Athletic Convocation Center (NA); High Point, NC
01/05/2012; 7:30 pm		Campbell	W 91–73	10–5 (4–1)	CSU Field House (670); Charleston, SC
01/07/2012; 5:30 pm		Coastal Carolina	L 77–80 ^{OT}	10–6 (4–2)	CSU Field House (978); Charleston, SC
01/10/2012; 7:00 pm		at Gardner–Webb	L 77–80	10–7 (4–3)	Paul Porter Arena (1,460); Boiling Springs, NC
01/12/2012; 7:30 pm		Presbyterian	W 65–58	11–7 (5–3)	CSU Field House (NA); Charleston, SC
01/19/2012; 7:00 pm		at UNC Asheville	W 93–88	12–7 (6–3)	Kimmel Arena (1,748); Asheville, NC
01/21/2012; 5:30 pm		Winthrop	W 77–66	13–7 (7–3)	CSU Field House (879); Charleston, SC
01/28/2012; 7:30 pm		at Presbyterian	W 75–64	14–7 (8–3)	Templeton Physical Education Center (1,360); Clinton, SC
02/02/2012; 7:00 pm		at Campbell	L 57–62	14–8 (8–4)	John W. Pope, Jr. Convocation Center (1,603); Buies Creek, NC
02/04/2012; 2:00 pm		at Coastal Carolina	L 58–71	14–9 (8–5)	Kimbel Arena (1,039); Conway, SC
02/09/2012; 7:30 pm		Liberty	L 74–75	14–10 (8–6)	CSU Field House (903); Charleston, SC
02/11/2012; 5:30 pm		High Point	W 70–67	15–10 (9–6)	CSU Field House (879); Charleston, SC
02/14/2012; 7:30 pm		Gardner–Webb	W 73–58	16–10 (10–6)	CSU Field House (761); Charleston, SC
02/18/2012*; 12:00 pm		Wofford; ESPN BracketBusters	W 77–59	17–10	CSU Field House (971); Charleston, SC
02/23/2012; 7:00 pm		at VMI	L 81–90	17–11 (10–7)	Cameron Hall (2,765); Lexington, VA
02/25/2012; 4:30 pm		at Radford	W 65–59	18–11 (11–7)	Dedmon Center (1,349); Radford, VA
2012 Big South Conference men's basketball tournament
02/29/2012; 8:30 pm		vs. Liberty; Quarterfinals	W 88–74	19–11	Kimmel Arena (1,568); Asheville, NC
03/01/2012; 8:00 pm, ESPNU		at UNC Asheville; Semifinals	L 64–91	19–12	Kimmel Arena (2,452); Asheville, NC
*Non-conference game. ^{#}Rankings from AP Poll. (#) Tournament seedings in parentheses. All times are in Eastern Time.
