= 2011–12 Liberty Flames basketball team =

American college basketball season

2011–12 Liberty Flames men's basketball
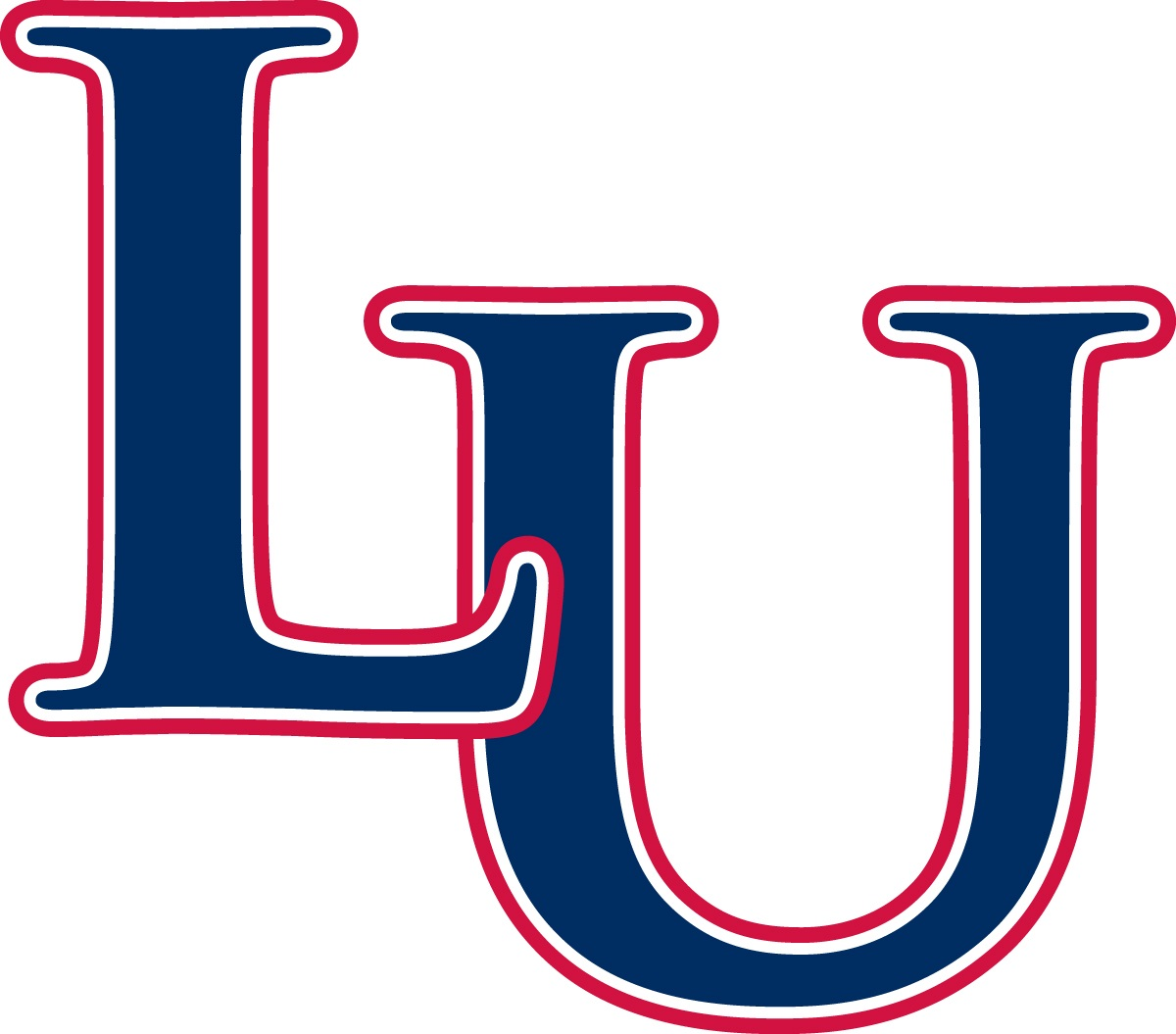
- Conference: Big South Conference
- Record: 15–17 (9–9 Big South)
- Head coach: Dale Layer (3rd season)
- Assistant coaches: Jason Eaker; Brian Joyce; Matt Olinger
- Home arena: Vines Center

2011–12 Big South men's basketball standings
	Conf.				Overall
Team	W		L	PCT	W		L	PCT
UNC Asheville†	16	–	2	.889	24	–	10	.706
Coastal Carolina	12	–	6	.667	19	–	12	.613
Campbell	11	–	7	.611	17	–	15	.531
Charleston Southern	11	–	7	.611	19	–	12	.613
Liberty	9	–	9	.500	15	–	17	.469
Winthrop	8	–	10	.444	12	–	20	.375
VMI	8	–	10	.444	17	–	16	.515
High Point	8	–	10	.444	13	–	18	.419
Presbyterian*	8	–	10	.444	14	–	15	.483
Gardner–Webb	6	–	12	.333	12	–	20	.375
Radford	2	–	16	.111	6	–	26	.188
† 2012 Big South tournament winner As of March 15, 2012; Rankings from AP Poll; *Ineligible for conference tournament

The 2011–12 Liberty Flames basketball team represented Liberty University during the 2011–12 NCAA Division I men's basketball season. The Flames, led by third year head coach Dale Layer, played their home games at the Vines Center and were members of the Big South Conference.

== Previous season ==
The Flames finished the 2010–11 season 19–13, 13–5 in Big South play to finish in second place. They lost in the quarterfinals of the Big South tournament to High Point.

== Departures ==
Name	Number	Pos.	Height	Weight	Year	Hometown	Notes
Garen Lafser	1	Guard	6'1"	175	Junior	St. Louis	Graduated
James Spencer	4	Guard	6'1"	190	Senior	Newport News, Virginia	Graduated
Evan Gordan	10	Guard	6'2"	185	Sophomore	Indianapolis	Transferred to Arizona State
Jeremy Anderson	12	Guard	6'4"	200	RS Junior	Bowling Green, KY	Graduated
Carter McMasters	14	Center	6'11"	210	Junior	Chattanooga, Tennessee	Graduated

== Roster ==
2011–12 Liberty Flames men's basketball team
Players
Coaches

Pos.	#	Name	Height	Weight	Year	Hometown
G	1	Tanner Hoyt	6 ft 6 in (1.98 m)	185 lb (84 kg)	Sr	Winterville, North Carolina
G	2	Chene Phillips	6 ft 2 in (1.88 m)	170 lb (77 kg)	So	Detroit
G	3	Walt Aikens	6 ft 1 in (1.85 m)	195 lb (88 kg)	RS So	Charlotte
G	5	Kelly Assinesi	6 ft 0 in (1.83 m)	170 lb (77 kg)	Fr	Greenville, South Carolina
F	11	Andrew Smith	6 ft 9 in (2.06 m)	220 lb (100 kg)	Jr	Pompano Beach, Florida
F	13	Tomasz Gielo	6 ft 9 in (2.06 m)	220 lb (100 kg)	Fr	Szczecin, Poland
G	14	David Minaya	6 ft 6 in (1.98 m)	205 lb (93 kg)	RS Sr	Riverview, Florida
G	15	Ethan Layer	6 ft 1 in (1.85 m)	160 lb (73 kg)	Fr	Forest, Virginia
G	20	John Brown	6 ft 4 in (1.93 m)	200 lb (91 kg)	RS Sr	Savannah, Georgia
C	21	Joel Vander Pol	6 ft 10 in (2.08 m)	230 lb (104 kg)	RS So	Fort Myers, Florida
G	22	Tavares Speaks	6 ft 4 in (1.93 m)	185 lb (84 kg)	Jr	Raleigh, North Carolina
F	24	Antwan Burrus	6 ft 6 in (1.98 m)	220 lb (100 kg)	Jr	Winterville, North Carolina
G	25	Jesse Sanders	6 ft 3 in (1.91 m)	200 lb (91 kg)	Sr	Sugar Land, Texas
F	32	Stephen Baird	6 ft 8 in (2.03 m)	220 lb (100 kg)	RS Fr	San Antonio, Texas
G	33	John Caleb Sanders	6 ft 0 in (1.83 m)	180 lb (82 kg)	So	Sugar Land, Texas
F	42	Sommy Ogukwe	6 ft 7 in (2.01 m)	230 lb (104 kg)	So	Abuja, Nigeria

Head coach

- Dale Layer (Eckerd)

Assistant coach(es)

- Jason Eaker (Texas–Pan American)
- Brian Joyce (Oklahoma Christian)
- Matt Olinger (Liberty)

Legend

- (C) Team captain
- (S) Suspended
- (I) Ineligible
- (W) Walk-on
- Injured
- Current redshirt

Roster
Last update: 2020-12-18

== Schedule and results ==
Date time, TV	Rank^{#}	Opponent^{#}	Result	Record	High points	High rebounds	High assists	Site (attendance) city, state
Non-conference regular season
11/09/2011*; 7:05 pm, FSSW/FSH		at No. 20 Texas A&M; Coaches vs. Cancer Classic	L 59-81	0–1	18 – JC Sanders	5 – Tied	9 – Jesse Sanders	Reed Arena (6,118); College Station, TX
11/09/2011*; 7:00 pm		Randolph College	W 81-58	1–1	18 – Speaks	9 – Jesse Sanders	8 – Jesse Sanders	Vines Center (2,331); Lynchburg, VA
11/14/2011*; 7:00 pm		at William & Mary	W 75-72	2–1	20 – Minaya	7 – Tied	8 – Jesse Sanders	Kaplan Arena (2,209); Williamsburg, VA
11/18/2011*; 7:00 pm		Eastern KY; 2K Sports Classic	L 65-73	2–2	19 – Tied	7 – Jesse Sanders	4 – Jesse Sanders	Vines Center (1,965); Lynchburg, VA
11/19/2011*; 7:00 pm		Lehigh; 2K Sports Classic	L 80-90	2–3	18 – JC Sanders	11 – Burrus	10 – Jesse Sanders	Vines Center (849); Lynchburg, VA
11/20/2011*; 7:00 pm		William & Mary; 2K Sports Classic	L 64-65	2–4	13 – Speaks	12 – Jesse Sanders	7 – Jesse Sanders	Vines Center (658); Lynchburg, VA
11/26/2011*; 7:30 pm		at Georgia St	L 50-72	2–5	16 – Speaks	7 – Jesse Sanders	4 – Phillips	GSU Sports Arena (803); Atlanta
12/01/2011; 7:05 pm		at Campbell	L 82-96	2–6 (0-1)	20 – Vander Pol	9 – Vander Pol	9 – Jesse Sanders	John W. Pope Jr. Convocation Center (1,680); Buies Creek, NC
12/03/2011; 2:00 pm		at Coastal Carolina	L 68-78	2–7 (0-2)	15 – Speaks	10 – Vander Pol	10 – Jesse Sanders	Kimbel Arena (1,039); Conway, SC
12/06/2011*; 7:00 pm		UNC Wilmington	L 68-77	2–8 (0-2)	19 – Jesse Sanders	13 – Jesse Sanders	7 – Jesse Sanders	Vines Center (1,611); Lynchburg, VA
12/10/2011*; 7:00 pm		Virginia Intermont	W 78-60	3–8 (0-2)	19 – Burrus	12 – Jesse Sanders	9 – Jesse Sanders	Vines Center (1,580); Lynchburg, VA
12/17/2011*; 7:00 pm		Hampton	W 74-65	4–8 (0-2)	22 – Jesse Sanders	8 – JC Sanders	9 – Jesse Sanders	Vines Center (780); Lynchburg, VA
12/20/2011*; 7:00 pm		Montreat	W 91-73	5–8 (0-2)	20 – JC Sanders	8 – Burrus	16 – Jesse Sanders	Vines Center (591); Lynchburg, VA
12/28/2011*; 7:00 pm		at Richmond	L 61-77	5–9 (0-2)	14 – Jesse Sanders	8 – Burrus	5 – Jesse Sanders	Robins Center (4,471); Richmond, VA
12/31/2011; 2:00 pm		Charleston Southern	L 76-81	5–10 (0-3)	20 – Jesse Sanders	10 – Jesse Sanders	8 – Jesse Sanders	Randolph Athletic and Dance Center (Randolph College) (358); Lynchburg, VA
1/2/2012; 7:00 pm		Presbyterian	L 56-63	5–11 (0-4)	15 – Minaya	12 – Jesse Sanders	9 – Jesse Sanders	Vines Center (475); Lynchburg, VA
1/7/2012; 4:30 pm		at UNCA Asheville	L 75-98	5–12 (0-5)	18 – JC Sanders	7 – Tied	10 – Jesse Sanders	Kimmel Arena (1,569); Asheville, NC
1/10/2012; 7:00 pm		at VMI	L 57-71	5–13 (0-6)	10 – Burrus	9 – Burrus	4 – Burrus	Cameron Hall (2,361); Lexington, VA
1/12/2012; 7:00 pm		Radford	W 69-64	6–13 (1-6)	17 – Jesse Sanders	11 – Minaya	5 – Jesse Sanders	Vines Center (908); Lynchburg, VA
1/14/2012; 7:00 pm		Winthrop	L 61-64 ^{yes}	6–14 (1-7)	13 – Jesse Sanders	10 – Jesse Sanders	8 – Jesse Sanders	Vines Center (1,346); Lynchburg, VA
1/21/2012; 7:00 pm		at High Point	W 84-78	7–14 (2-7)	15 – 3 Tied	10 – Jesse Sanders	13 – Jesse Sanders	Millis Center (1,502); High Point, NC
1/26/2012; 7:00 pm		at Winthrop	L 63-65	7–15 (2-8)	13 – Tied	8 – Jesse Sanders	10 – Jesse Sanders	Winthrop Coliseum (1,196); Rock Hill, SC
1/28/2012; 4:00 pm		at Radford	W 67-65	8–15 (3-8)	15 – Tied	7 – Jesse Sanders	6 – Jesse Sanders	Dedmon Center (1,279); Radford, VA
1/28/2012; 4:00 pm		Gardner Webb	W 63-58	9–15 (4-8)	16 – Minaya	9 – Jesse Sanders	8 – Jesse Sanders	Vines Center (1,838); Lynchburg, VA
2/4/2012; 7:00 pm		UNC Asheville	L 51-65	9–16 (4-9)	15 – JC Sanders	10 – Burrus	6 – Jesse Sanders	Vines Center (2,368); Lynchburg, VA
2/9/2012; 7:30 pm		at Charleston Southern	W 75-74	10–16 (5-9)	20 – Minaya	6 – Vander Pol	9 – Jesse Sanders	Buccaneer Field House (903); North Charleston, SC
2/11/2012; 7:00 pm		at Presbyterian	W 77-64	11–16 (6-9)	19 – Jesse Sanders	6 – Jesse Sanders	10 – Jesse Sanders	Templeton Center (2,300); Clinton, SC
2/14/2012; 7:00 pm		Presbyterian	W 78-69	12–16 (7-9)	20 – Minaya	13 – Jesse Sanders	5 – Jesse Sanders	Vines Center (1,442); Lynchburg, VA
2/18/2012*; 7:00 pm		at Morgan State; Sears BracketBusters	L 69-81	12–17 (7-9)	21 – Jesse Sanders	6 – Jesse Sanders	4 – Jesse Sanders	Hill Field House (1,054); Baltimore
2/23/2012; 7:00 pm		Coastal Carolina	W 61-57	13–17 (8-9)	18 – Minaya	9 – Jesse Sanders	11 – Jesse Sanders	Vines Center (2,765); Lynchburg, VA
2/25/2012; 7:00 pm		Campbell	W 49-41	14–17 (9-9)	20 – Burrus	12 – Burrus	9 – Jesse Sanders	Vines Center (3,894); Lynchburg, VA
Big South tournament
2/29/2012; 8:30 pm		vs. No. 4 Charleston Southern; BSC Championship Quarterfinals	L 74-88	15–17 (9-9)	17 – Minaya	8 – Jesse Sanders	7 – Jesse Sanders	Kimmel Arena (1,568); Asheville, NC
*Non-conference game. ^{#}Rankings from AP Poll. (#) Tournament seedings in parentheses. All times are in Eastern Time..
