= 2011–12 Coastal Carolina Chanticleers men's basketball team =

American college basketball season

2011–12 Coastal Carolina Chanticleers men's basketball

CIT, First Round
- Conference: Big South Conference
- Record: 19–12 (12–6 Big South)
- Head coach: Cliff Ellis (5th season)
- Assistant coaches: Don Hogan; Benny Moss (1st season); Mamadou N'Diaye (1st season)
- Home arena: Kimbel Arena

2011–12 Big South men's basketball standings
	Conf.				Overall
Team	W		L	PCT	W		L	PCT
UNC Asheville†	16	–	2	.889	24	–	10	.706
Coastal Carolina	12	–	6	.667	19	–	12	.613
Campbell	11	–	7	.611	17	–	15	.531
Charleston Southern	11	–	7	.611	19	–	12	.613
Liberty	9	–	9	.500	15	–	17	.469
Winthrop	8	–	10	.444	12	–	20	.375
VMI	8	–	10	.444	17	–	16	.515
High Point	8	–	10	.444	13	–	18	.419
Presbyterian*	8	–	10	.444	14	–	15	.483
Gardner–Webb	6	–	12	.333	12	–	20	.375
Radford	2	–	16	.111	6	–	26	.188
† 2012 Big South tournament winner As of March 15, 2012; Rankings from AP Poll; *Ineligible for conference tournament

The 2011–12 Coastal Carolina Chanticleers men's basketball team represented Coastal Carolina University during the 2011–12 NCAA Division I men's basketball season. The Chanticleers, led by fifth year head coach Cliff Ellis, played their home games at Kimbel Arena and are members of the Big South Conference. They finished the season 19–12, 12–6 in Big South play to finish in second place. They lost in the quarterfinals of the Big South Basketball tournament to VMI. The team received invitation to the 2012 CollegeInsider.com Tournament where they lost in the first round to Old Dominion.

== Roster ==
Number	Name	Position	Height	Weight	Year	Hometown
0	Warren Gillis	Guard	6–3	200	Freshman	Philadelphia, Pennsylvania
1	Brandon Crawford	Guard/Forward	6–5	210	Freshman	Montgomery, Alabama
2	Anthony Raffa	Guard	6–1	170	Junior	Sea Isle City, New Jersey
4	Richie Berry	Guard	6–0	175	Junior	Herndon, Virginia
5	Sam McLaurin	Forward	6–8	230	Junior	Havana, Florida
10	Charles Ashford	Guard	6–1	180	Junior	Lexington, Kentucky
11	Dexter Moore	Guard	6–1	173	Senior	Bluefield, West Virginia
15	Chris Gradnigo	Forward	6–7	223	Senior	Lake Charles, Louisiana
23	Willie Kirkland	Guard	6–4	205	Senior	Graceville, Florida
32	Bisi Addey	Forward	6–7	205	Junior	Montgomery, Alabama
33	Tyler Poole	Forward	6–7	210	Freshman	Hickory, North Carolina
34	Jordan Griffin	Guard	6–2	191	Senior	Edgewood, Kentucky
40	Jon Pack	Center	6–11	250	Senior	Dallas, Georgia
55	Kierre Greenwood	Guard	6–2	175	Junior	Cincinnati, Ohio

== Schedule ==
Date time, TV	Rank^{#}	Opponent^{#}	Result	Record	Site (attendance) city, state
Regular season
11/11/2011*; 7:00 pm		Covenant	W 96–54	1–0	Kimbel Arena (1,037); Conway, SC
11/12/2011*; 7:00 pm		Methodist	W 104–61	2–0	Kimbel Arena (1,037); Conway, SC
11/15/2011*; 7:00 pm		LSU	W 71–63	3–0	Kimbel Arena (1,039); Conway, SC
11/18/2011*; 7:00 pm		Spalding	W 87–43	4–0	Kimbel Arena (742); Conway, SC
11/22/2011*; 9:00 pm, FS South		at Clemson	W 60–59	5–0	Littlejohn Coliseum (6,211); Clemson, SC
11/26/2011*; 7:30 pm		at Florida International	L 62–64	5–1	U.S. Century Bank Arena (908); Miami, FL
12/01/2011; 7:00 pm		VMI	W 87–78	6–1 (1–0)	Kimbel Arena (1,039); Conway, SC
12/03/2011; 2:00 pm		Liberty	W 78–68	7–1 (2–0)	Kimbel Arena (1,039); Conway, SC
12/06/2011*; 7:05 pm		at The Citadel	W 80–58	8–1	McAlister Field House (1,409); Charleston, SC
12/16/2011*; 7:00 pm		Lynchburg	W 86–61	9–1	Kimbel Arena (1,039); Conway, SC
12/19/2011*; 7:00 pm		at East Carolina	L 51–76	9–2	Williams Arena at Minges Coliseum (4,175); Greenville, NC
12/22/2011*; 7:00 pm		College of Charleston	L 70–77	9–3	Kimbel Arena (1,049); Conway, SC
12/31/2011; 7:00 pm		at High Point	W 55–52	10–3 (3–0)	Millis Athletic Convocation Center (1,003); High Point, NC
01/02/2012; 7:45 pm		at Campbell	L 65–70 ^{OT}	10–4 (3–1)	John W. Pope, Jr. Convocation Center (1,364); Buies Creek, NC
01/07/2012; 5:30 pm		at Charleston Southern	W 80–77 ^{OT}	11–4 (4–1)	CSU Field House (978); Charleston, SC
01/12/2012; 7:00 pm		Gardner–Webb	W 65–63	12–4 (5–1)	Kimbel Arena (1,039); Conway, SC
01/14/2012; 4:00 pm		Presbyterian	W 81–63	13–4 (6–1)	Kimbel Arena (1,039); Conway, SC
01/17/2012; 7:00 pm		at UNC Asheville	L 81–88	13–5 (6–2)	Kimmel Arena (2,041); Asheville, NC
01/21/2012; 2:00 pm		Radford	W 82–62	14–5 (7–2)	Kimbel Arena (1,039); Conway, SC
01/26/2012; 7:00 pm		at Presbyterian	W 52–49	15–5 (8–2)	Templeton Physical Education Center (801); Clinton, SC
01/28/2012; 7:00 pm		at Gardner–Webb	W 70–56	16–5 (9–2)	Paul Porter Arena (2,045); Boiling Springs, NC
02/04/2012; 2:00 pm, MASN		Charleston Southern	W 71–58	17–5 (10–2)	Kimbel Arena (1,039); Conway, SC
02/07/2012; 7:00 pm		Campbell	L 75–81	17–6 (10–3)	Kimbel Arena (1,039); Conway, SC
02/09/2012; 7:00 pm		High Point	L 65–70	17–7 (10–4)	Kimbel Arena (1,039); Conway, SC
02/11/2012; 4:00 pm		at Winthrop	L 57–67	17–8 (10–5)	Winthrop Coliseum (1,935); Rock Hill, SC
02/09/2012; 7:00 pm		UNC Asheville	W 74–69	18–8 (11–5)	Kimbel Arena (1,039); Conway, SC
02/18/2012*; 12:00 pm		Tennessee Tech; ESPN BracketBusters	L 71–77	18–9	Kimbel Arena (1,039); Conway, SC
02/23/2012; 7:00 pm		at Liberty	L 57–61	18–10 (11–6)	Vines Center (2,765); Lynchburg, VA
02/25/2012; 1:00 pm		at VMI	W 81–64	19–10 (12–6)	Cameron Hall (2,451); Lexington, VA
2012 Big South Conference men's basketball tournament
02/29/2012; 12:00 pm	(2)	vs. (7) VMI; Quarterfinals	L 68–85	19–11	Kimmel Arena (443); Asheville, NC
2012 CIT
03/13/2012*; 7:00 pm		at Old Dominion; First Round	L 66–68	19–12	Ted Constant Convocation Center (2,246); Norfolk, VA
*Non-conference game. ^{#}Rankings from AP Poll. (#) Tournament seedings in parentheses. All times are in Eastern Time.
