= 2012 Big South Conference men's basketball tournament =

- Classification: Division I
- Season: 2011–12
- Teams: 10
- First round site: Campus sites
- Quarterfinals site: Kimmel Arena; Asheville, NC
- Semifinals site: Kimmel Arena; Asheville, NC
- Finals site: Kimmel Arena; Asheville, NC
- Champions: UNC Asheville (4th title)
- Winning coach: Ed Biedenbach (3rd title)
- MVP: J. P. Primm (UNC Asheville)
- Top scorer: J. P. Prim (UNC Asheville) (58 points)

2011–12 Big South men's basketball standings
	Conf.				Overall
Team	W		L	PCT	W		L	PCT
UNC Asheville†	16	–	2	.889	24	–	10	.706
Coastal Carolina	12	–	6	.667	19	–	12	.613
Campbell	11	–	7	.611	17	–	15	.531
Charleston Southern	11	–	7	.611	19	–	12	.613
Liberty	9	–	9	.500	15	–	17	.469
Winthrop	8	–	10	.444	12	–	20	.375
VMI	8	–	10	.444	17	–	16	.515
High Point	8	–	10	.444	13	–	18	.419
Presbyterian*	8	–	10	.444	14	–	15	.483
Gardner–Webb	6	–	12	.333	12	–	20	.375
Radford	2	–	16	.111	6	–	26	.188
† 2012 Big South tournament winner As of March 15, 2012; Rankings from AP Poll; *Ineligible for conference tournament

The 2012 Big South men's basketball tournament took place February 27, 29, March 1, and March 3, 2012. The semifinals were televised on ESPNU, and the championship on ESPN2. It was the first year the Big South introduced a first round that consisted of 2 games to be held on campus sites of the higher seeds. VMI and High Point defeated Radford and Gardner-Webb, respectively, to advance to the quarterfinals, held at UNC Asheville's Kimmel Arena along with the semifinals.

The quarterfinals featured a pair of upsets, the first from the hands of VMI. The 7-seeded Keydets used a huge 2nd half run to pull away from #2 seed Coastal Carolina 85–68. Later that day, #6 Winthrop defeated #3 Campbell 71–55 thanks to 25 points from Reggie Middleton. Top-seed UNC Asheville blew away High Point 86–61, followed by Charleston Southern beating Liberty 89–72.

VMI continued their upset run with a 20-point drubbing over Winthrop 75–55. Asheville defeated Charleston Southern 91–64, thus gaining home-court advantage for the championship game on March 3. In a game that flip-flopped leads in the first half, Asheville used a 9–0 run to break a 47–47 tie with VMI and take the lead for good. After the Keydets got 2 to make the score 58–52, the Bulldogs ended the game on a 22–12 run to win the Big South crown for a second straight year.

== Format ==
With the addition of Campbell from the Atlantic Sun, the Big South introduced a new format for 2012 where the top 10 teams in the standings qualified for the tournament. The 10-team field was the largest in the event's history, and first round games were contested for just the second time – the last occurring in 1993.

Initially, the Big South intended for only the top 10 teams to make the tournament, as Presbyterian was supposed to be complete its Division I transition this season. However, Presbyterian was given another transition year thus, remained ineligible for the NCAA tournament and thus not allowed to participate. As such, the ten other teams will contest the bracket.

This was the last tournament in which early-round games were held at campus sites. In June 2012, the conference announced that the 2013 men's and women's tournaments would be held solely at the Student Recreation and Convocation Center on Coastal Carolina's Conway, South Carolina campus, a venue which would ultimately open in fall 2012 as the HTC Center. With Presbyterian completing its Division I transition and Longwood joining the conference, the 2013 tournament will be the first to feature 12 teams.

== Bracket ==
First round Monday, February 27
7	VMI	55
10	Radford	53
8	High Point	68
9	Gardner–Webb	58

Quarterfinals; Wednesday, February 29
2	Coastal Carolina	68
7	VMI	85
3	Campbell	55
6	Winthrop	71
1	UNC Asheville	86
8	High Point	61
4	Charleston Southern	89
5	Liberty	72

Semifinals; Thursday, March 1
7	VMI	75
6	Winthrop	55
1	UNC Asheville	91
4	Charleston Southern	64

Championship; Saturday, March 3
7	VMI	64
1	UNC Asheville	80

* – Denotes overtime
First round at campus sites of higher-numbered seeds
Quarterfinals and Semifinals games at #1 seed, Kimmel Arena in Asheville, NC
Championship game hosted by highest remaining seed
