= 2011–12 UNC Asheville Bulldogs men's basketball team =

American college basketball season

2011–12 UNC Asheville Bulldogs men's basketball
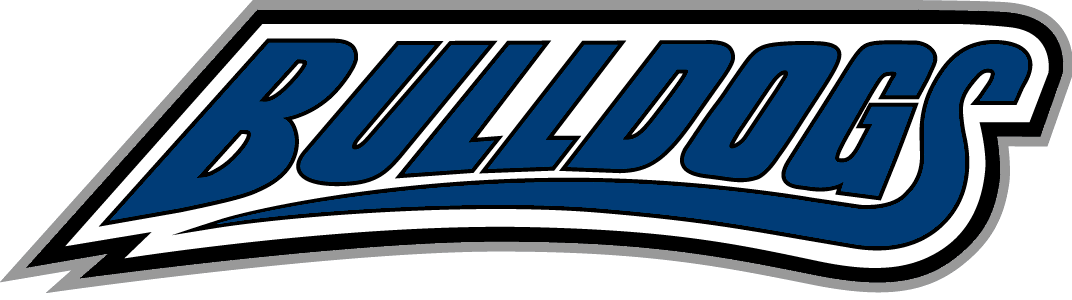

Big South Regular Season & tournament champions

NCAA Tournament, Round of 64
- Conference: Big South Conference
- Record: 24–10 (16–2 Big South)
- Head coach: Ed Biedenbach (16th season)
- Assistant coaches: Nicholas McDevitt; Brett Carey; Dion Dacons
- Home arena: Kimmel Arena

2011–12 Big South men's basketball standings
	Conf.				Overall
Team	W		L	PCT	W		L	PCT
UNC Asheville†	16	–	2	.889	24	–	10	.706
Coastal Carolina	12	–	6	.667	19	–	12	.613
Campbell	11	–	7	.611	17	–	15	.531
Charleston Southern	11	–	7	.611	19	–	12	.613
Liberty	9	–	9	.500	15	–	17	.469
Winthrop	8	–	10	.444	12	–	20	.375
VMI	8	–	10	.444	17	–	16	.515
High Point	8	–	10	.444	13	–	18	.419
Presbyterian*	8	–	10	.444	14	–	15	.483
Gardner–Webb	6	–	12	.333	12	–	20	.375
Radford	2	–	16	.111	6	–	26	.188
† 2012 Big South tournament winner As of March 15, 2012; Rankings from AP Poll; *Ineligible for conference tournament

The 2011–12 UNC Asheville Bulldogs men's basketball team represented the University of North Carolina at Asheville during the 2011–12 NCAA Division I men's basketball season. The Bulldogs, led by 16th year head coach Ed Biedenbach, played their home games at the brand new Kimmel Arena and are members of the Big South Conference. They finished the season 24–10, 16–2 in Big South play to be crowned regular season champions. The Bulldogs won the Big South tournament for the second straight year to earn the conference's automatic berth into the NCAA tournament where they lost in the second round to Syracuse.

== Roster ==
Number	Name	Position	Height	Weight	Year	Hometown
2	Matt Dickey	Guard	6–1	180	Senior	Trussville, Alabama
3	J. P. Primm	Guard	6–1	195	Senior	Dickson, Tennessee
4	Chris Stephenson	Guard	6–3	200	Senior	Punta Gorda, Florida
5	Jaron Lane	Guard	6–4	170	Junior	Greenville, North Carolina
11	Josh Seligson	Guard	6–3	205	Sophomore	Raleigh, North Carolina
12	Madison Davis	Guard	5–10	160	Junior	Waynesville, North Carolina
15	Jeremy Atkinson	Forward	6–4	210	Junior	Elm City, North Carolina
20	Chudier Pal	Center	6–9	230	Sophomore	Rockingham, Australia
21	Thomas Bess	Guard	6–0	180	Freshman	Bessemer City, North Carolina
22	Corey Littlejohn	Guard	6–3	180	Freshman	Columbia, South Carolina
23	Keith Hornsby	Guard	6–4	190	Freshman	Williamsburg, Virginia
32	Quinard Jackson	Forward	6–5	240	Senior	West Palm Beach, Florida
33	D. J. Cunningham	Center	6–10	240	Junior	Waterford, Ohio
35	Jon Nwannunu	Forward	6–8	225	Junior	Merrillville, Indiana
45	Jaleel Roberts	Center	7–0	220	Freshman	Evans, Georgia
50	Jeremy Harn	Forward	6–8	230	Junior	Chapel Hill, North Carolina
55	Trent Meyer	Guard	6–2	165	Sophomore	Fort Lauderdale, Florida

== Schedule ==
Date time, TV	Rank^{#}	Opponent^{#}	Result	Record	Site (attendance) city, state
Exhibition
11/07/2011*; 8:00 pm		Lees–McRae	W 98–67		Kimmel Arena; Asheville, NC
Regular season
11/11/2011*; 7:00 pm		at No. 22 NC State	L 75–84	0–1	RBC Center (12,441); Raleigh, NC
11/13/2011*; 4:00 pm, ESPNU		No. 1 North Carolina	L 75–91	0–2	Kimmel Arena (3,280); Asheville, NC
11/16/2011*; 7:00 pm		Mars Hill; First Round	W 126–75	1–2	Kimmel Arena (1,187); Asheville, NC
11/21/2011*; 7:00 pm		Brevard	W 89–48	2–2	Kimmel Arena (1,321); Asheville, NC
11/24/2011*; 7:00 pm, HDNet		vs. No. 4 Connecticut; Battle 4 Atlantis First Round	L 63–73	2–3	Imperial Arena (2,530); Nassau, Bahamas
11/25/2011*; 7:00 pm, HDNet		vs. College of Charleston; Battle 4 Atlantis Consolation Round	L 66–68	2–4	Imperial Arena (NA); Nassau, Bahamas
11/26/2011*; 9:30 pm, HDNet/Versus		vs. Utah; Battle 4 Atlantis 7th Place Game	W 87–65	3–4	Imperial Arena (1,645); Nassau, Bahamas
12/01/2011; 5:30 pm		Gardner–Webb	W 66–60	4–4 (1–0)	Paul Porter Arena (1,320); Boiling Springs, NC
12/04/2011*; 2:00 pm, WMYA		USC Upstate	W 88–81	5–4	Kimmel Arena (1,796); Asheville, NC
12/15/2011*; 7:00 pm		Montreat College	W 109–61	6–4	Kimmel Arena (1,821); Asheville, NC
12/20/2011*; 7:00 pm, SPSO		at Tennessee	L 68–72	6–5	Thompson–Boling Arena (15,324); Knoxville, TN
12/28/2011*; 6:00 pm		at Western Carolina	L 67–86	6–6	Ramsey Center (1,511); Cullowhee, NC
12/31/2011; 4:00 pm, MASN		at Winthrop	W 73–68 ^{OT}	7–6 (2–0)	Winthrop Coliseum (1,207); Rock Hill, SC
01/02/2012; 7:00 pm		at Radford	W 66–56	8–6 (3–0)	Dedmon Center (431); Radford, VA
01/05/2012; 7:00 pm		VMI	W 94–85	9–6 (4–0)	Kimmel Arena (1,620); Asheville, NC
01/07/2012; 4:30 pm		Liberty	W 98–75	10–6 (5–0)	Kimmel Arena (1,569); Asheville, NC
01/12/2012; 7:00 pm		at Campbell	W 89–82	11–6 (6–0)	John W. Pope, Jr. Convocation Center (3,035); Buies Creek, NC
01/14/2012; 7:00 pm		at High Point	W 86–79	12–6 (7–0)	Millis Athletic Convocation Center (1,474); High Point, NC
01/17/2012; 7:00 pm, ESPN3		Coastal Carolina	W 88–81	13–6 (8–0)	Kimmel Arena (2,041); Asheville, NC
01/19/2012; 7:00 pm		Charleston Southern	L 88–93	13–7 (8–1)	Kimmel Arena (1,748); Asheville, NC
01/21/2012; 7:00 pm		at Presbyterian	W 66–58	14–7 (9–1)	Templeton Physical Education Center (1,610); Clinton, SC
01/26/2012; 7:00 pm		High Point	W 90–70	15–7 (10–1)	Kimmel Arena (1,542); Asheville, NC
01/28/2012; 4:30 pm, WMYA		Campbell	W 95–84	16–7 (11–1)	Kimmel Arena (2,104); Asheville, NC
02/02/2012; 7:00 pm		at VMI	W 89–86	17–7 (12–1)	Cameron Hall (2,319); Lexington, VA
02/04/2012; 7:00 pm		at Liberty	W 65–51	18–7 (13–1)	Vines Center (2,368); Lynchburg, VA
02/11/2012; 4:30 pm		Radford	W 88–62	19–7 (14–1)	Kimmel Arena (2,754); Asheville, NC
02/14/2012; 7:00 pm		at Coastal Carolina	L 69–74	19–8 (14–2)	Kimbel Arena (1,039); Conway, SC
02/18/2012*; 7:00 pm, ESPN3		at Ohio; ESPN BracketBusters	L 62–81	19–9	Convocation Center (9,961); Athens, OH
02/23/2012; 7:00 pm		Gardner–Webb	W 71–61	20–9 (15–2)	Kimmel Arena (1,765); Asheville, NC
02/25/2012; 2:00 pm, WMYA		Winthrop	W 67–55	21–9 (16–2)	Kimmel Arena (2,875); Asheville, NC
2012 Big South Conference men's basketball tournament
02/29/2012; 6:00 pm		High Point; Quarterfinals	W 86–61	22–9	Kimmel Arena (1,568); Asheville, NC
03/01/2012; 8:00 pm, ESPNU		Charleston Southern; Semifinals	W 91–64	23–9	Kimmel Arena (2,452); Asheville, NC
03/03/2012; 12:00 pm, ESPN2		VMI; Championship Game	W 80–64	24–9	Kimmel Arena (3,205); Asheville, NC
2012 NCAA tournament
03/15/2012*; 3:10 pm, truTV	No. (E 16)	vs. No. 2 (E 1) Syracuse; Second Round	L 65–72	24–10	Consol Energy Center (18,927); Pittsburgh, PA
*Non-conference game. ^{#}Rankings from AP Poll. (#) Tournament seedings in parentheses. All times are in Eastern Time (#) during NCAA Tournament is seed with Region.
