= 2011–12 VMI Keydets basketball team =

American college basketball season

2011–12 VMI Keydets men's basketball
- Conference: Big South Conference
- Record: 17–16 (8–10 Big South)
- Head coach: Duggar Baucom (7th season)
- Assistant coaches: Daniel Willis (7th season); Jack Castleberry (4th season); Jason Allison (7th season)
- Home arena: Cameron Hall

2011–12 Big South men's basketball standings
	Conf.				Overall
Team	W		L	PCT	W		L	PCT
UNC Asheville†	16	–	2	.889	24	–	10	.706
Coastal Carolina	12	–	6	.667	19	–	12	.613
Campbell	11	–	7	.611	17	–	15	.531
Charleston Southern	11	–	7	.611	19	–	12	.613
Liberty	9	–	9	.500	15	–	17	.469
Winthrop	8	–	10	.444	12	–	20	.375
VMI	8	–	10	.444	17	–	16	.515
High Point	8	–	10	.444	13	–	18	.419
Presbyterian*	8	–	10	.444	14	–	15	.483
Gardner–Webb	6	–	12	.333	12	–	20	.375
Radford	2	–	16	.111	6	–	26	.188
† 2012 Big South tournament winner As of March 15, 2012; Rankings from AP Poll; *Ineligible for conference tournament

The 2011–12 VMI Keydets basketball team represented the Virginia Military Institute in the 2011–12 NCAA Division I men's basketball season. In their 104th year of basketball, the Keydets of the Big South Conference were coached by Duggar Baucom in his seventh year.

== Recruiting ==
College recruiting information
Name	Hometown	School	Height	Weight	Commit date
Quinton Upshur guard/forward	Norfolk, VA	Booker T. Washington	6 ft 5 in (1.96 m)	210 lb (95 kg)	
Quinton Upshur guard/forward	Recruit ratings: No ratings found				
Brian Brown guard	Kings Mountain, NC	Kings Mountain	5 ft 11 in (1.80 m)	185 lb (84 kg)	
Brian Brown guard	Recruit ratings: (40)				
Christian Burton guard	Virginia Beach, VA	Kellam	5 ft 10 in (1.78 m)	170 lb (77 kg)	
Christian Burton guard	Recruit ratings: No ratings found				
Jarid Watson center	Burtonsville, MD	Springbrook	6 ft 7 in (2.01 m)	210 lb (95 kg)	
Jarid Watson center	Recruit ratings: No ratings found				
Jordan Weethee forward	Greensboro, NC	High Point Christian	6 ft 6 in (1.98 m)	220 lb (100 kg)	
Jordan Weethee forward	Recruit ratings: No ratings found				
Overall recruit ranking:
Note: In many cases, Scout, Rivals, 247Sports, On3, and ESPN may conflict in their listings of height and weight.; In these cases, the average was taken. ESPN grades are on a 100-point scale.; Sources: "College Basketball Recruiting Schools: VMI Keydets 2011". ESPN.; "2011 Team Ranking". Rivals.

== Roster ==
2011–12 VMI Keydets men's basketball team
Players
Coaches

Pos.	#	Name	Height	Weight	Year	Hometown
G	1	Rodney Glasgow Jr.	5 ft 10 in (1.78 m)	170 lb (77 kg)	So	Olney, MD
G/F	2	Quinton Upsher	6 ft 5 in (1.96 m)	210 lb (95 kg)	Fr	Norfolk, VA
G	3	Brian Brown	5 ft 11 in (1.8 m)	185 lb (84 kg)	Fr	Kings Mountain, NC
G	4	Christian Burton (injured)	5 ft 10 in (1.78 m)	170 lb (77 kg)	Fr	Virginia Beach, VA
G	5	Drew Absher	5 ft 10 in (1.78 m)	170 lb (77 kg)	So	Mocksville, NC
F	11	Stan Okoye	6 ft 5 in (1.96 m)	205 lb (93 kg)	Jr	Raleigh, NC
G	14	Joe Carr (injured)	6 ft 3 in (1.91 m)	195 lb (88 kg)	Jr	Houston, TX
F	15	Ron Burks	6 ft 4 in (1.93 m)	215 lb (98 kg)	Sr	Mitchellville, MD
G	21	Keith Gabriel	6 ft 4 in (1.93 m)	185 lb (84 kg)	Sr	Charlotte, NC
C	24	D.J. Covington	6 ft 9 in (2.06 m)	235 lb (107 kg)	So	Virginia Beach, VA
F	30	Nick Gore	6 ft 6 in (1.98 m)	220 lb (100 kg)	Jr	Waynesboro, VA
G	31	Michael Sparks	6 ft 4 in (1.93 m)	195 lb (88 kg)	Sr	Lexington, KY
C	32	Wayne Whiting	6 ft 7 in (2.01 m)	240 lb (109 kg)	Sr	Richmond Hill, GA
C	34	Jarid Watson	6 ft 7 in (2.01 m)	210 lb (95 kg)	Fr	Burtonsville, MD
F	40	Jordan Weethee	6 ft 6 in (1.98 m)	220 lb (100 kg)	Fr	Greensboro, NC

Head coach

- Duggar Baucom

Assistant coach(es)

- Daniel Willis
- Jack Castleberry
- Jason Allison

Legend

- (C) Team captain
- (S) Suspended
- (I) Ineligible
- (W) Walk-on
- Injured
- Current redshirt

== Schedule ==
Date time, TV	Rank^{#}	Opponent^{#}	Result	Record	Site (attendance) city, state
Regular Season
November 11*; 12:00 am, CBSSN		vs. The Citadel; All-Military Classic	W 103–100	1–0	Clune Arena (3,679); Colorado Springs, CO
November 12*; 10:30 pm		at Air Force; All Military Classic	L 65–75	1–1	Clune Arena (2,052); Colorado Springs, CO
November 15*; 7:00 pm		Alice Lloyd College	W 101–74	2–1	Cameron Hall (875); Lexington, VA
November 19*; 6:00 pm		UMBC	W 84–79	3–1	Cameron Hall (3,113); Lexington, VA
November 23*; 7:00 pm, BTN		at No. 3 Ohio State	L 74–107	3–2	Value City Arena (13,660); Columbus, OH
December 1; 7:00 pm		at Coastal Carolina	L 78–87	3–3 (0–1)	Kimbel Arena (1,039); Conway, SC
December 3; 5:30 pm		at Charleston Southern	L 81–114	3–4 (0–2)	CSU Field House (872); Charleston, SC
December 6*; 7:00 pm		at No. 10 Pittsburgh	L 70–97	3–5	Petersen Events Center (8,923); Pittsburgh, PA
December 8*; 7:00 pm		Central Penn	W 109–86	4–5	Cameron Hall (868); Lexington, VA
December 10*; 1:00 pm		Milligan	W 122–73	5–5	Cameron Hall (2,923); Lexington, VA
December 12*; 7:00 pm		at Longwood	L 89–110	5–6	Willett Hall (324); Farmville, VA
December 22*; 7:00 pm		at Old Dominion	L 73–81	5–7	Ted Constant Convocation Center (7,886); Norfolk, VA
December 31; 1:00 pm		Presbyterian	W 78–70 ^{OT}	6–7 (1–2)	Cameron Hall (1,205); Lexington, VA
January 2; 7:00 pm		Gardner-Webb	W 76–72	7–7 (2–2)	Cameron Hall (762); Lexington, VA
January 5; 7:00 pm		at UNC Asheville	L 85–94	7–8 (2–3)	Kimmel Arena (1,620); Asheville, NC
January 7; 4:00 pm		at Winthrop	L 84–91	7–9 (2–4)	Winthrop Coliseum (1,704); Rock Hill, SC
January 10; 7:00 pm, Flames TV		Liberty	W 71–57	8–9 (3–4)	Cameron Hall (2,361); Lexington, VA
January 14; 8:00 pm, MASN		Radford	W 80–76	9–9 (4–4)	Cameron Hall (3,428); Lexington, VA
January 19; 7:00 pm		High Point	W 88–77	10–9 (5–4)	Cameron Hall (1,216); Lexington, VA
January 21; 3:30 pm		at Campbell	L 73–80	10–10 (5–5)	John W. Pope, Jr. Convocation Center (2,947); Buies Creek, NC
January 26; 7:00 pm		at Radford	W 65–60	11–10 (6–5)	Dedmon Center (1,168); Radford, VA
February 2; 7:00 pm		UNC Asheville	L 86–89	11–11 (6–6)	Cameron Hall (2,319); Lexington, VA
February 4; 1:00 pm		Winthrop	W 86–79	12–11 (7–6)	Cameron Hall (3,665); Lexington, VA
February 9; 7:00 pm		at Presbyterian	L 74–94	12–12 (7–7)	Templeton Physical Education Center (827); Clinton, SC
February 11; 7:00 pm		at Gardner-Webb	L 61–77	12–13 (7–8)	Paul Porter Arena (1,645); Boiling Springs, NC
February 14; 7:00 pm, ESPN3		at Liberty	L 69–78	12–14 (7–9)	Vines Center (1,442); Lynchburg, VA
February 18*; 1:00 pm		William & Mary; 2012 ESPNU BracketBusters	W 73–65	13–14	Cameron Hall (2,041); Lexington, VA
February 23; 7:00 pm		Charleston Southern	W 90–81	14–14 (8–9)	Cameron Hall (868); Lexington, VA
February 25; 1:00 pm		Coastal Carolina	L 64–81	14–15 (8–10)	Cameron Hall (2,541); Lexington, VA
2012 Big South Conference men's basketball tournament
February 27; 7:00 pm		Radford; First Round	W 55–53	15–15	Cameron Hall (1,243); Lexington, VA
February 29; 12:00 pm		vs. Coastal Carolina; Quarterfinals	W 85–68	16–15	Kimmel Arena (443); Asheville, NC
March 1; 6:00 pm, ESPNU		vs. Winthrop; Semifinals	W 75–55	17–15	Kimmel Arena (2,452); Asheville, NC
March 3; 12:00 pm, ESPN2		at UNC Asheville; Championship Game	L 64–80	17–16	Kimmel Arena (3,205); Asheville, NC
*Non-conference game. ^{#}Rankings from AP Poll. (#) Tournament seedings in parentheses. All times are in Eastern Time.
