= 1996–97 Charleston Southern Buccaneers men's basketball team =

American college basketball season

1996–97 Charleston Southern Buccaneers men's basketball
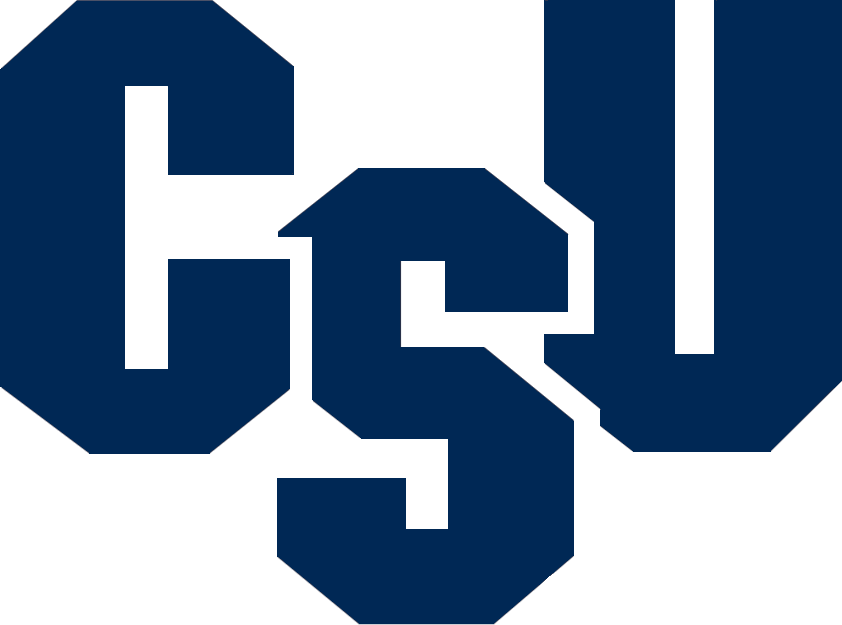

Big South tournament champion

NCAA tournament, First round
- Conference: Big South Conference
- Record: 17–13 (7–7 Big South)
- Head coach: Tom Conrad
- Home arena: Buccaneer Field House

1996–97 Big South Conference men's basketball standings
	Conf.				Overall
Team	W		L	PCT	W		L	PCT
UNC Asheville	11	–	3	.786	18	–	10	.643
Liberty	11	–	3	.786	23	–	9	.719
Radford	8	–	6	.571	15	–	13	.536
Charleston Southern †	7	–	7	.500	17	–	13	.567
Coastal Carolina	6	–	8	.429	11	–	16	.407
UNC Greensboro	6	–	8	.429	10	–	20	.333
Winthrop	5	–	9	.357	12	–	15	.444
UMBC	2	–	12	.143	5	–	22	.185
† 1997 Big South tournament winner Rankings from AP Poll

The 1996–97 Charleston Southern Buccaneers men's basketball team represented Charleston Southern University in the 1996–97 NCAA Division I men's basketball season. The Buccaneers, led by head coach Tom Conrad, played their home games at the Buccaneer Field House in North Charleston, South Carolina as members of the Big South Conference.

After finishing fourth in the conference regular season standings, the Buccaneers won the Big South tournament to receive an automatic bid to the NCAA tournament. The team lost to No. 2 seed UCLA in the opening round to finish with a 17–13 record (7–7 Big South). To date, this is Charleston Southern's only appearance in the NCAA Tournament in program history.

== Roster ==
1996–97 Charleston Southern Buccaneers men's basketball team
Players	Coaches
Pos. / # / Name / Height / Weight / Year / Hometown; G / 3 / Brett Larrick / 6 ft 4 in (1.93 m) / — / Sr	Head coach: Tom Conrad; Assistant coach(es) Legend: (C) Team captain; (S) Suspended; (I) Ineligible; (W) Walk-on; Injured; Current redshirt; Roster

== Schedule and results ==
Date time, TV	Rank^{#}	Opponent^{#}	Result	Record	Site (attendance) city, state
Regular season
Nov 22, 1996*		College of Charleston	L 68–81	0–1	Buccaneer Field House (3,068); North Charleston, South Carolina
Nov 26, 1996*		at Anderson (SC)	W 82–57	1–1	Abney Athletic Center (666); Anderson, South Carolina
Nov 30, 1996*		at Toledo	L 66–80	1–2	John F. Savage Hall (3,656); Toledo, Ohio
Dec 2, 1996		Centenary (NJ)	W 84–50	2–2 (2–0)	Buccaneer Fieldhouse (316); North Charleston, South Carolina
Dec 6, 1996*		vs. Yale	L 55–61	2–3	McCann Recreation Center (1,980); Poughkeepsie, New York
Dec 7, 1996*		at Marist	W 53–51 ^{2OT}	3–3	McCann Recreation Center (1,112); Poughkeepsie, New York
Dec 14, 1996*		at No. 10 Clemson	L 57–80	3–4	Littlejohn Coliseum (8,500); Clemson, South Carolina
Dec 16, 1996*		at Furman	W 67–57	4–4	Physical Activity Center (615); Greenville, South Carolina
Dec 18, 1996*		South Carolina State	W 73–62	5–4	Buccaneer Fieldhouse (307); North Charleston, South Carolina
Dec 21, 1996*		at The Citadel	L 80–86 ^{OT}	5–5	McAlister Field House (724); Charleston, South Carolina
Dec 28, 1996*		at South Carolina	W 85–81	6–5	Carolina Coliseum (5,582); Columbia, South Carolina
Jan 2, 1997*		The Citadel	W 77–61	7–5	Buccaneer Fieldhouse (881); North Charleston, South Carolina
Jan 9, 1997		Coastal Carolina	L 82–92	7–6 (0–1)	Buccaneer Fieldhouse (726); North Charleston, South Carolina
Jan 11, 1997		at UNC Greensboro	L 64–78	7–7 (0–2)	Fleming Gymnasium (918); Greensboro, North Carolina
Jan 16, 1997		UMBC	W 64–57	8–7 (1–2)	CSU Fieldhouse (581); North Charleston, South Carolina
Jan 18, 1997		at UNC Asheville	L 71–84	8–8 (1–3)	Charlie Justice Center (1,550); Asheville, North Carolina
Jan 25, 1997		at Liberty	L 68–72	8–9 (1–4)	Vines Center (4,275); Lynchburg, Virginia
Jan 28, 1997		at Radford	W 79–73	9–9 (2–4)	Donald N. Dedmon Center (1,200); Radford, Virginia
Jan 30, 1997		Winthrop	W 76–65	10–9 (3–4)	CSU Fieldhouse (488); North Charleston, South Carolina
Feb 1, 1997		UNC Asheville	W 73–66	11–9 (4–4)	CSU Fieldhouse (1,048); North Charleston, South Carolina
Feb 3, 1997		at Coastal Carolina	W 72–53	12–9 (5–4)	Kimbel Arena (1,015); Conway, South Carolina
Feb 8, 1997		UNC Greensboro	W 79–72	13–9 (6–4)	Buccaneer Fieldhouse (1,276); North Charleston, South Carolina
Feb 13, 1997		at Winthrop	W 75–71	14–9 (7–4)	Winthrop Coliseum (592); Rock Hill, South Carolina
Feb 15, 1997		Radford	L 71–76	14–10 (7–5)	Buccaneer Fieldhouse (932); North Charleston, South Carolina
Feb 17, 1997		Liberty	L 77–80	14–11 (7–6)	Buccaneer Fieldhouse (888); North Charleston, South Carolina
Feb 22, 1997		at UMBC	L 80–85 ^{OT}	14–12 (7–7)	RAC Arena (864); Catonsville, Maryland
Big South tournament
Feb 26, 1997*	(4)	vs. (5) Coastal Carolina; Quarterfinals	W 67–51	15–12	Vines Center (950); Lynchburg, Virginia
Feb 28, 1997*	(4)	vs. (1) UNC Asheville; Semifinals	W 67–57	16–12	Vines Center (8,343); Lynchburg, Virginia
Mar 1, 1997*	(4)	at (2) Liberty; Championship game	W 64–54	17–12	Vines Center (7,439); Lynchburg, Virginia
NCAA Tournament
Mar 13, 1997*	(15 MW)	vs. (2 MW) No. 7 UCLA; First round	L 75–109	17–13	Palace of Auburn Hills (21,020); Auburn Hills, Michigan
*Non-conference game. ^{#}Rankings from AP poll. (#) Tournament seedings in parentheses. All times are in Eastern.
