= 1997 Big South Conference men's basketball tournament =

- Classification: Division I
- Season: 1996–97
- Teams: 8
- Site: Vines Center; Lynchburg, VA
- Champions: Charleston Southern (4th title)
- Winning coach: Tom Conrad (1st title)
- MVP: Peter Aluma (Liberty)

1996–97 Big South Conference men's basketball standings
	Conf.				Overall
Team	W		L	PCT	W		L	PCT
UNC Asheville	11	–	3	.786	18	–	10	.643
Liberty	11	–	3	.786	23	–	9	.719
Radford	8	–	6	.571	15	–	13	.536
Charleston Southern †	7	–	7	.500	17	–	13	.567
Coastal Carolina	6	–	8	.429	11	–	16	.407
UNC Greensboro	6	–	8	.429	10	–	20	.333
Winthrop	5	–	9	.357	12	–	15	.444
UMBC	2	–	12	.143	5	–	22	.185
† 1997 Big South tournament winner Rankings from AP Poll

The 1997 Big South Conference men's basketball tournament took place February 26–March 1, 1997, at the Vines Center in Lynchburg, Virginia, the home of the Liberty Flames. For the fourth time in their school history, the Charleston Southern Buccaneers won the tournament, led by head coach Tom Conrad.

The Buccaneers advanced to their first NCAA tournament in school history (the first three times they won the conference tournament, the conference did not have an automatic bid to the NCAA tournament.) As of 2023, this is Charleston Southern's only NCAA tournament appearance.

== Format ==
All eight teams participated in the tournament, hosted at the Vines Center. Teams were seeded by conference winning percentage. This was the last season for UNC Greensboro as a member of the league, who left for the Southern Conference the following season.

== Bracket ==
Quarterfinals; February 26
1	UNC Asheville	54
8	UMBC	51
4	Charleston Southern	67
5	Coastal Carolina	51
3	Radford	78
6	UNC Greensboro	76
2	Liberty	83
7	Winthrop	69

Semifinals; February 28
1	UNC Asheville	57
4	Charleston Southern	67
3	Radford	73
2	Liberty	85

Finals; March 1
4	Charleston Southern	64
2	Liberty	54

- Source

== All-Tournament Team ==
- Peter Aluma, Liberty
- Rolando Hourruitiner, Charleston Southern
- Brett Larrick, Charleston Southern
- Larry Jackson, Liberty
- Corey Reed, Radford
