= Zach Chu =

American basketball coach

Current position
- Title: Head coach
- Team: Radford
- Conference: Big South
- Record: 17–19 (.472)

Biographical details
- Born: October 26, 1992 (age 34)

Playing career
- 2011–2015: Richmond

Coaching career (HC unless noted)
- 2016–2019: Texas Legends (assistant)
- 2025–present: Radford

Administrative career (AD unless noted)
- 2019–2021: Dallas Mavericks (basketball analytics liaison)
- 2021–2024: Indiana Pacers (manager of game strategy & analytics)
- 2024–2025: SMU (chief strategist for men's basketball)

Head coaching record
- Overall: 17–19 (.472)

Zach Chu (born October 26, 1992) is an American basketball coach. He is currently the head coach of the Radford Highlanders men's basketball team.

== Career ==
Chu played college basketball for the University of Richmond. After graduating, he worked as a player development intern with the Los Angeles Clippers, before serving as an assistant coach for the Texas Legends for three seasons. Chu then served as a basketball analyst for the Dallas Mavericks, before being named the manager of game strategy and analytics for the Indiana Pacers. He spent three seasons with the Pacers, before being hired as the chief strategist for the SMU Mustangs.

On March 16, 2025, Chu was named the next head coach at Radford, replacing Darris Nichols.

== Personal life ==
Chu is half-Chinese.

== Head coaching record ==
Record table
Season	Team	Overall	Conference	Standing	Postseason
Radford (Big South) (2025–present)
2025–26	Radford	16–16	9–7	3rd	
2026–27	Radford	1–3	0–0		
Radford:		17–19 (.472)	9–7 (.563)		
Total:		17–19 (.472)			
National champion Postseason invitational champion Conference regular season champion Conference regular season and conference tournament champion Division regular season champion Division regular season and conference tournament champion Conference tournament champion
