= Tony Fairley =

American basketball player

Personal information
- Listed height: 6 ft 1 in (1.85 m)

Career information
- High school: Central (Miami, Florida)
- College: Miami Dade CC (1983–1985); Charleston Southern (1985–1987)
- NBA draft: 1987: undrafted
- Position: Point guard

Career highlights
- NCAA steals leader (1987)

Tony A. Fairley is an American former basketball player. He formerly held the National Collegiate Athletic Association (NCAA) Division I record for recording the most assists in a single game with 22. He shares this record with Syracuse's Sherman Douglas, Southern's Avery Johnson, and Oklahoma's Trae Young. Fairley had his 22-assist game on February 9, 1987, against Armstrong State College. Incidentally, Fairley also recorded 10 steals in that game as well – one of two times when he grabbed 10 steals in a game, which are Charleston Southern University records. In 1986–87, his senior season at Charleston Southern, Fairley also led Division I in steals with a 4.07 per game average.

Fairley graduated in 1988 as the Big South Conference's all-time leader in both steals per game (3.68) and assists per game (7.58), each of which still stand atop the record books through the 2012–13 season.

The closest he ever got to playing in the National Basketball Association (NBA) after his college career was playing on the Miami Heat's training camp roster from May 1988 through October 1988.

== See also ==
- List of NCAA Division I men's basketball season steals leaders
- List of NCAA Division I men's basketball players with 20 or more assists in a game
