= Jimmie Williams =

American college basketball coach

Current position
- Title: Head coach
- Team: Campbell
- Conference: Colonial Athletic Association
- Record: 0–0

Playing career
- 1998–2002: MidAmerica Nazarene

Coaching career (HC unless noted)
- 2006–2008: MidAmerica Nazarene (assistant)
- 2008–2009: Stoutland HS
- 2009–2010: Texas Wesleyan (assistant)
- 2010–2011: Southwestern (assistant)
- 2011–2015: North Greenville (assistant)
- 2015–2018: William Jewell (assistant)
- 2018–2022: Furman (assistant)
- 2022–2026: Anderson
- 2026–present: Campbell

Head coaching record
- Overall: 69–49

Jimmie Williams is an American college basketball coach. He is currently the head coach for the Campbell Fighting Camels.

After starring at Olathe East High School, Williams played for MidAmerica Nazarene and was twice named to the all-conference team. He played professionally briefly before working in business for a few years. Williams began his coaching career as an assistant at his alma mater. Williams served as head coach of Stoutland High School in Texas for a season before assistantships at Texas Wesleyan and Southwestern.

From 2011 to 2015, Williams was an assistant coach at North Greenville and helped lead the team to their first Conference Carolinas title. In 2015, he joined William Jewell as an associate head coach. Williams served as an assistant coach at Furman from 2018 to 2022 under Bob Richey, helping the team achieve their first Top 25 ranking. In April 2022, he was named head coach of the Anderson Trojans of the Division II ranks. Williams was named the 2025-26 NABC District Coach of the Year and the South Atlantic Conference (SAC) Coach of the Year after leading Anderson University to a 29-3 record and top 10 ranking.

In April 2026, Williams was named head coach of the Campbell Fighting Camels.

== Head coaching record ==
Record table
Season	Team	Overall	Conference	Standing	Postseason
Anderson Trojans (SAC) (2022–2026)
2022–23	Anderson	9-19	6-12	T9th	
2023–24	Anderson	15-14	10-10	T7th	
2024–25	Anderson	16-13	12-12	7th	
2025–26	Anderson	29-3	20-2	1st	NCAA Division II Round of 64
Anderson:		69–49 (.585)	48–26 (.649)		
Campbell Fighting Camels (CAA) (2026–present)
2026–27	Campbell	0–0	0–0		
Campbell:		0–0 (–)	0–0 (–)		
Total:		69–49 (.585)			
National champion Postseason invitational champion Conference regular season champion Conference regular season and conference tournament champion Division regular season champion Division regular season and conference tournament champion Conference tournament champion
