= Mike Netti =

American basketball coach

Current position
- Title: Assistant coach
- Team: Illinois State
- Conference: Missouri Valley Conference

Biographical details
- Born: Liverpool, New York, U.S.
- Education: Syracuse University

Playing career
- 1998–2000: Alvernia
- Position: Guard

Coaching career (HC unless noted)
- 2004–2006: Gardner-Webb (assistant)
- 2006–2008: St. Francis Brooklyn (assistant)
- 2008–2010: Lackawanna
- 2010–2013: Gardner–Webb (assistant)
- 2013–2017: East Carolina (assistant)
- 2017–2022: Ohio State (spec. assistant)
- 2022–2024: Ohio State (assistant)
- 2025–present: Illinois State (assistant)

Michael Netti is an American basketball coach and former player. He is currently an assistant coach at Illinois State University.

== Early life and playing career ==
Netti was born and raised in Liverpool, New York. He played college basketball at Alvernia University (then called Alvernia College) in Reading, Pennsylvania from 1998 to 2000. After the 1999–00 season, he transferred to Syracuse and discontinued his basketball career.

== Coaching career ==
=== Gardner Webb (first stint) ===
Netti's first job as an assistant coach was at Gardner-Webb under head coach Rick Scruggs.

=== St. Francis Brooklyn ===
He was hired as an assistant coach at St. Francis Brooklyn in 2006 and stayed there through 2008.

=== Lackawanna College ===
In 2008, he was hired as the head coach at Lackawanna College. He spent two seasons there, winning 43 games in total.

=== Gardner-Webb (second stint) ===
Netti returned to Gardner–Webb in 2010 and spent three seasons there. He served under then–head coach Chris Holtmann, who was an assistant coach during Netti's first stint at Gardner–Webb.

=== East Carolina ===
In 2013, he was hired by East Carolina to be an assistant coach in the staff of head coach Jeff Lebo.

=== Ohio State ===
After four seasons at East Carolina, Netti was hired as a special assistant at Ohio State, where he was reunited once again with Holtmann, who had become the head coach there. In this role, he helped create offensive game plans and worked with players off the court. When Ryan Pedon and Tony Skinn left Ohio State for other opportunities in 2022, Netti was promoted to assistant coach.

=== Illinois State ===
At the conclusion of the 2024-25 season, Netti was hired as an assistant coach at Illinois State University.

== Personal life ==
Netti is married, and has two children.

== Head coaching record ==
Record table
Season	Team	Overall	Conference	Standing	Postseason
Lackawanna (NJCAA) (2008–2010)
2008–09	Lackawanna	25–7			
2009–10	Lackawanna	18–12			
Lackawanna:		43–19			
Total:		43–19			
National champion Postseason invitational champion Conference regular season champion Conference regular season and conference tournament champion Division regular season champion Division regular season and conference tournament champion Conference tournament champion
