= Taje' Kelly =

American basketball player (born 2003)

No. 1 – Medi Bayreuth
- Position: Center
- League: ProA

Personal information
- Born: January 3, 2003 (age 23)
- Listed height: 6 ft 7 in (2.01 m)
- Listed weight: 237 lb (108 kg)

Career information
- High school: Grayson (Loganville, Georgia)
- College: Charleston Southern (2021–2025)
- NBA draft: 2025: undrafted
- Playing career: 2025–present

Career history
- 2025–present: Medi Bayreuth

Career highlights
- Big South Player of the Year (2025); First-team All-Big South (2025)

Taje' Kelly (born January 3, 2003) is an American professional basketball player for Medi Bayreuth in the German ProA. He played college basketball for the Charleston Southern Buccaneers.

== High school career ==
Kelly attended Grayson High School in Loganville, Georgia.

== College career ==
After high school, he committed to play college basketball at Charleston Southern University. As a true freshman, he made an instant impact, being named to the Big South All-Freshman Team. As a senior, Kelly was named the Big South Player of the Year, averaging 20.5 points and 8.9 rebounds a game.

== Professional career ==
Following the close of his college career, Kelly signed with Medi Bayreuth in Germany.

== Career statistics ==
Legend
GP	Games played	GS	Games started	MPG	Minutes per game
FG%	Field goal percentage	3P%	3-point field goal percentage	FT%	Free throw percentage
RPG	Rebounds per game	APG	Assists per game	SPG	Steals per game
BPG	Blocks per game	PPG	Points per game	**Bold**	Career high

=== College ===
Year	Team	GP	GS	MPG	FG%	3P%	FT%	RPG	APG	SPG	BPG	PPG
2021–22	Charleston Southern	**31**	8	20.8	**.594**	–	**.721**	4.0	.6	.5	**.5**	9.2
2022–23	Charleston Southern	**31**	29	26.4	.585	.000	.670	5.5	1.0	.4	.3	10.7
2023–24	Charleston Southern	30	29	30.7	.475	**.385**	.672	7.6	1.5	.4	**.5**	14.4
2024–25	Charleston Southern	**31**	**30**	**36.5**	.497	.317	.616	**8.9**	**2.1**	**.8**	.4	**20.5**
Career		123	96	28.6	.522	.340	.655	6.5	1.3	.5	.4	13.7
