= HTC Center =

Indoor arena in South Carolina, United States

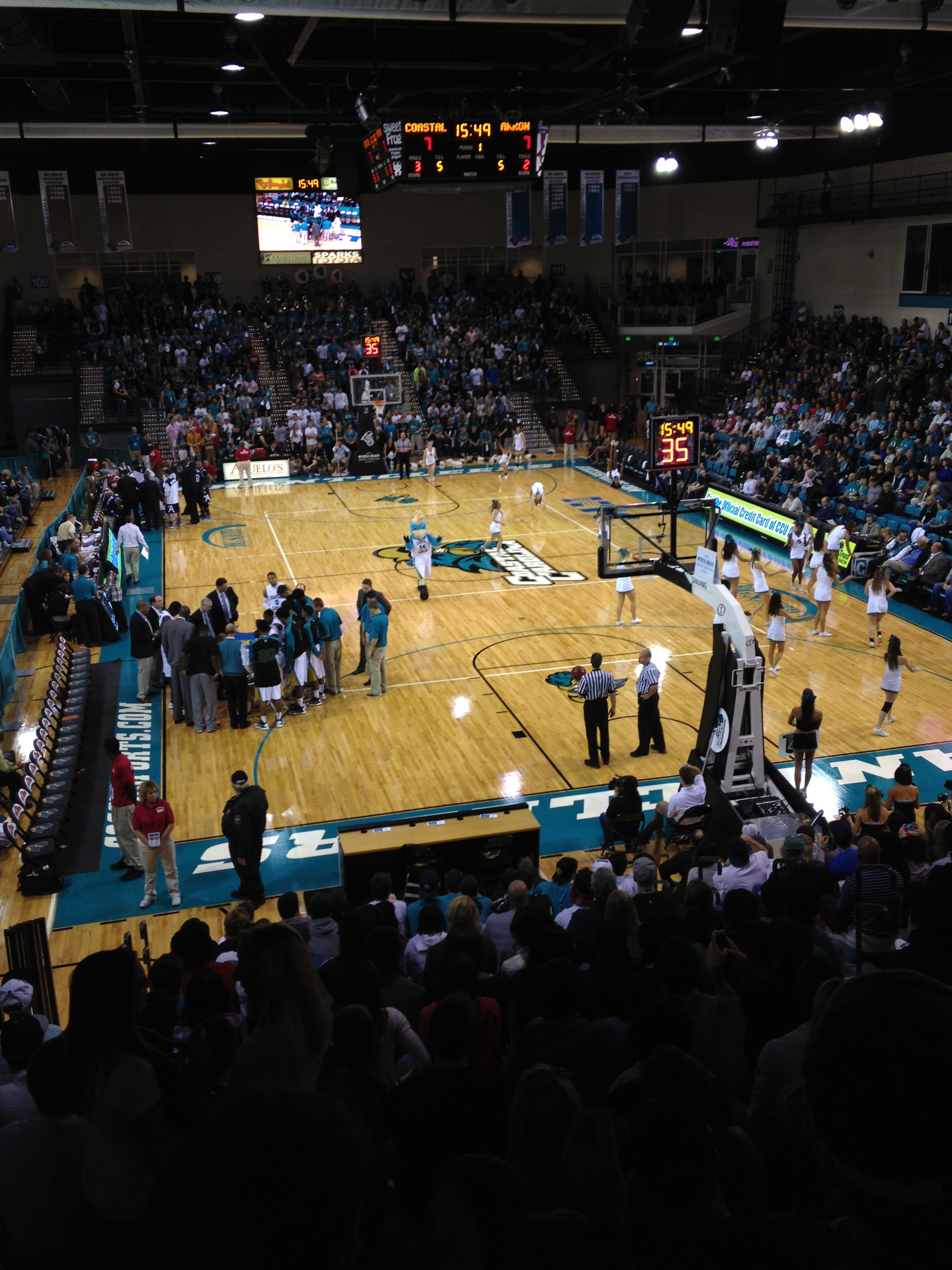
- Interactive map of HTC Center
- Full name: HTC Student Recreation & Convocation Center
- Former names: Student Recreation and Convocation Center (planning)
- Location: 104 Founders Drive; Conway, SC 29579
- Coordinates: 33°47′57″N 79°0′56″W
- Owner: Coastal Carolina University
- Operator: Coastal Carolina University
- Capacity: 3,212
- Surface: Multi-surface

Construction
- Groundbreaking: April 15, 2010
- Opened: August 1, 2012
- Cost: $35 million
- Architects: Hughes Group Architects; Garvin Design Group; Timbes Architectural Group
- Services engineer: RMF Engineering
- General contractor: PC Construction

Tenants
- Coastal Carolina Chanticleers (NCAA Sports)

HTC Center, originally known as the Student Recreation and Convocation Center, is a 3,370-seat multi-purpose arena located on the campus of Coastal Carolina University in Conway, South Carolina. It is home to the Coastal Carolina University men's and women's basketball teams and the women's volleyball teams. The arena replaced Kimbel Arena as Coastal Carolina's basketball and volleyball home. On August 2, 2012, Horry Telephone Cooperative purchased the naming rights to the venue.

An earlier planned arena, named YRT2 Arena, was to have opened in 2008. It would have also been home to a future ECHL franchise, the Myrtle Beach Thunderboltz.

Both the men's and women's programs opened the facility with victories. The men defeated the University of Akron 74–70 in overtime on November 9, 2012. The women's program followed with a 58–39 victory against North Carolina Central University on November 12, 2012.

== Features ==
The HTC Center features 3,212 seats – 662 chair-back seats on one side of the court behind the team benches, 814 bench-back seats on the other side, about 700 on each end (including one end reserved for students), 40 courtside seats, 35 each in two corner balcony sections that can be rented out each game as a package with catering and then additional seating in the spacious Chanticleer Athletic Foundation and president's suites that run the length of one side.

== See also ==
- List of NCAA Division I basketball arenas
