= T. L. Latson =

American basketball player

Personal information
- Born: 1970s
- Listed height: 6 ft 7 in (2.01 m)

Career information
- High school: P.K. Yonge Lab (Gainesville, Florida)
- College: Charleston Southern (1992–1996)
- NBA draft: 1996: undrafted
- Position: Small forward

Career history
- 1999–2004: Indios de Mayagüez

Career highlights
- Big South Player of the Year (1996); First-team All-Big South (1996); Second-team All-Big South (1994); Big South co-Rookie of the Year (1993)

T. L. Latson (born 1970s) is an American former professional basketball player. He played for Indios de Mayagüez in Puerto Rico's Baloncesto Superior Nacional (BSN) between 1999 and 2004. He is 6'7" and played the small forward position.

A native of Gainesville, Florida, Latson attended P.K. Yonge Developmental Research School where he starred on the basketball team. He graduated in 1992 and went on to play college basketball at Charleston Southern University between 1992 and 1996. In his freshman season in 1992–93 he was named the co-Big South Conference Rookie of the Year. For the next three seasons he led the Buccaneers in rebounding, and during his senior season in 1995–96 he led the team in scoring. Latson finished his collegiate career with 1,518 points and 704 rebounds. His senior year also saw him get named the Big South Conference Player of the Year, which was the second year in a row a player from Charleston Southern had earned that honor (teammate Eric Burks won in 1995).

Latson went unselected in the 1996 NBA draft and carved out a professional career overseas.
