= Saah Nimley =

Liberian basketball player and coach (born 1993)

Charleston Southern Buccaneers
- Title: Head coach
- League: Big South Conference

Personal information
- Born: June 3, 1993 (age 33) Monrovia, Liberia
- Listed height: 173 cm (5 ft 8 in)
- Listed weight: 158 lb (72 kg)

Career information
- High school: Collins Hill (Lawrenceville, Georgia)
- College: Charleston Southern (2011–2015)
- NBA draft: 2015: undrafted
- Playing career: 2015–2019
- Position: Guard
- Number: 5
- Coaching career: 2019–present

Career history

Playing
- 2015–2016: Nevėžis
- 2016-2017: Vilpas Vikings
- 2017–2018: Newcastle Eagles
- 2018: Zornotza ST
- 2018–2019: Šiauliai

Coaching
- 2019–2023: Charleston Southern (assistant)
- 2023–present: Charleston Southern

Career highlights
- Big South Player of the Year (2015); First-team All-Big South (2015)

Saah Nimley (born June 3, 1993) is a Liberian college basketball coach and former player who is the head coach of the men's basketball team at Charleston Southern University, his alma mater. As a senior at Charleston Southern in 2014–15, Nimley averaged 21.5 points and 4.1 assists per game, ranking first and third in the Big South, respectively. The guard was named the Big South Player of the Year that year.

Nimley retired in 2019 and started his coaching career, becoming an assistant coach at Charleston Southern under his former head coach, Barclay Radebaugh. In November 2023, following the resignation of Radebaugh, Nimley was named interim head coach of the team. On March 4, 2024, the university removed the interim tag from Nimley.

== Head coaching record ==
Record table
Season	Team	Overall	Conference	Standing	Postseason
Charleston Southern Buccaneers (Big South Conference) (2023–present)
2023–24	Charleston Southern	8–15	6–10	T–5th	
2024–25	Charleston Southern	10–22	6–10	7th	
2025–26	Charleston Southern	15–17	6–10	7th	
2026–27	Charleston Southern	2–3	0–0		
Charleston Southern:		35–57 (.380)	18–30 (.375)		
Total:		35–57 (.380)			
National champion Postseason invitational champion Conference regular season champion Conference regular season and conference tournament champion Division regular season champion Division regular season and conference tournament champion Conference tournament champion
