= Charleston Southern Buccaneers men's basketball =

2025–26 Charleston Southern Buccaneers men's basketball team
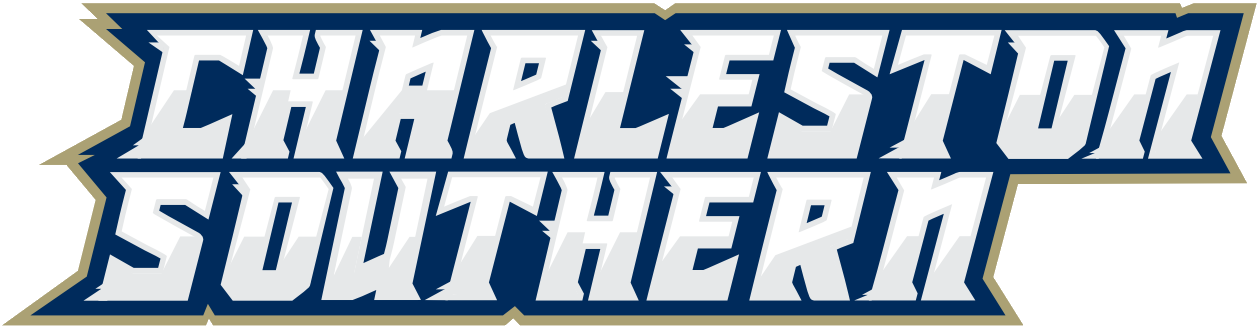
- University: Charleston Southern University
- Head coach: Saah Nimley (2nd season)
- Location: North Charleston, South Carolina
- Arena: North Charleston Coliseum & Buccaneer Field House (capacity: 11,475 / 881)
- Conference: Big South
- Nickname: Buccaneers
- Colors: Blue and gold

NCAA Division I tournament appearances
- 1997

Conference tournament champions
- 1986, 1987, 1995, 1997

Conference regular-season champions
- 1986, 1987, 2013, 2015

The Charleston Southern Buccaneers men's basketball team is the men's basketball team that represents Charleston Southern University in North Charleston, South Carolina, United States. The school's team currently competes in the Big South Conference. The Buccaneers made their only appearance in the NCAA Division I men's basketball tournament in 1997.

== History ==
=== NCAA tournament results ===
Charleston Southern has competed in the NCAA tournament once, in 1997; the Buccaneers lost to UCLA 109–75 in the first round.

Year	Round	Opponent	Result
1997	First Round	UCLA	L 75–109

=== NIT results ===
Charleston Southern has competed in the National Invitation Tournament (NIT) twice. Their combined record is 0–2.

Year	Round	Opponent	Result
2013	First Round	Southern Miss	L 71–78
2015	First Round	Old Dominion	L 56–65

=== CIT results ===
The Buccaneers have appeared in the CollegeInsider.com Postseason Tournament (CIT), one time. Their record is 1–1.

Year	Round	Opponent	Result
2019	First Round; Second Round	Florida Atlantic; Hampton	W 68–66; L 67–73

== Notable players ==
- Claudell Harris Jr., born 2002, shooting guard, Israeli Basketball Premier League
- Rolando Hourruitiner, born 1975, businessman
- Christian Keeling, born 1998, shooting guard, the Korisliiga in Finland
- Taje' Kelly, born 2003, center, the German ProA
- T. L. Latson, born 1970s, small forward
