= Kimbel Arena =

Arena in Conway, South Carolina

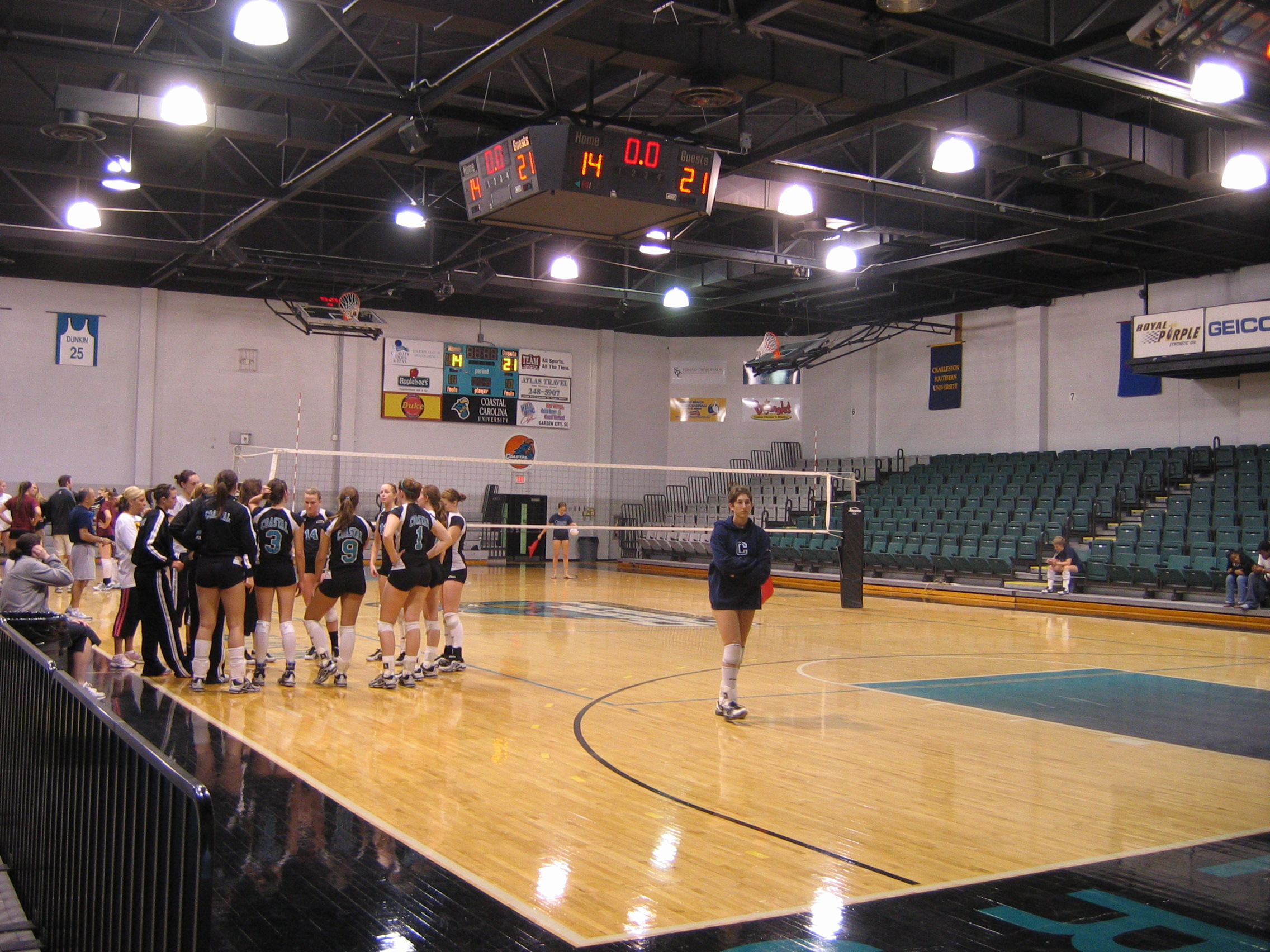
- Interactive map of Kimbel Arena
- Location: Conway, South Carolina, United States
- Coordinates: 33.79382°N 79.013243°W
- Owner: Coastal Carolina University
- Operator: Coastal Carolina University
- Capacity: 1,039

Tenants
- Coastal Carolina Chanticleers (NCAA Sports)

Kimbel Arena is a 1,039-seat multi-purpose arena located on the campus of Coastal Carolina University in Conway, South Carolina, United States. It was home to the Coastal Carolina University men's and women's basketball teams and the women's volleyball team through the 2011–12 season, but those teams moved to the new HTC Center in the fall of 2012. The arena hosted the 2010 and 2011 Big South Conference men's basketball tournament finals.

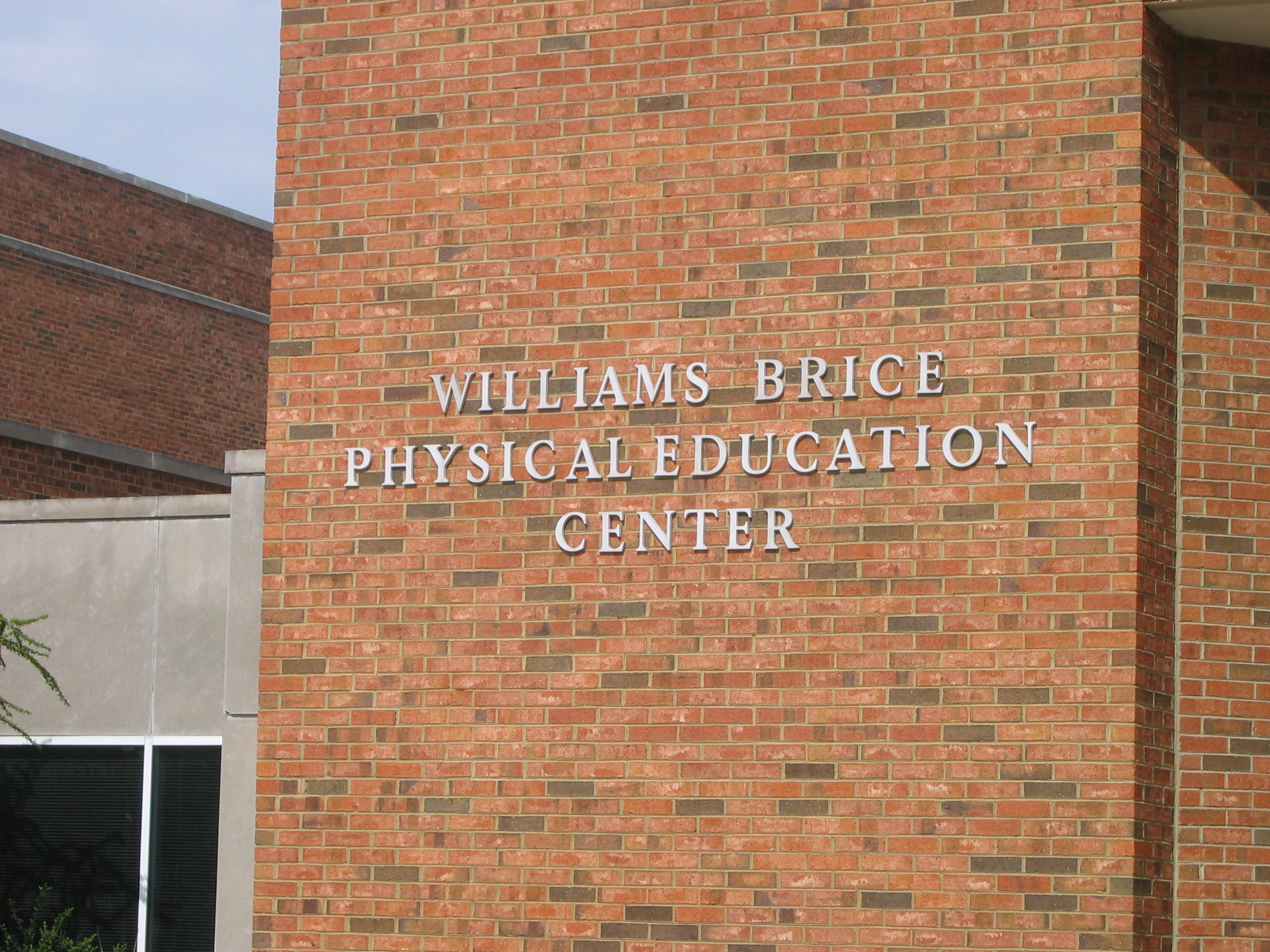

The arena is located inside the Williams Brice Physical Education Center.
