= Presbyterian Blue Hose men's basketball =

Men's basketball program representing Presbyterian College

2026–27 Presbyterian Blue Hose men's basketball team
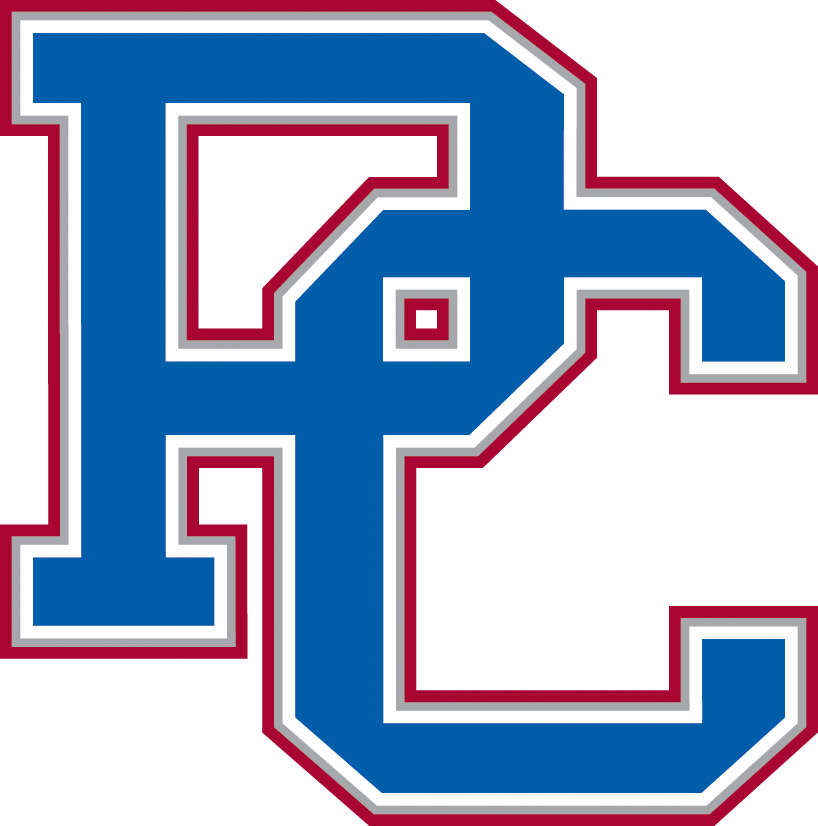
- University: Presbyterian College
- First season: 1913–14
- Head coach: Quinton Ferrell (7th season)
- Location: Clinton, South Carolina
- Arena: Templeton Physical Education Center (capacity: 2,300)
- Conference: Big South
- Nickname: Blue Hose
- Colors: Blue and garnet

NCAA Division I tournament Sweet Sixteen
- Division II: 2003

NCAA Division I tournament appearances
- Division II: 1996, 1997, 2003, 2006

Conference tournament champions
- SAC: 1996

The Presbyterian Blue Hose men's basketball team is the basketball team that represents Presbyterian College in Clinton, South Carolina, United States. The school's team currently competes in the Big South Conference. The Blue Hose are coached by Quinton Ferrell. The Blue Hose have never appeared in the NCAA Division I men's basketball tournament.

== Conference affiliations ==
NAIA

- NAIA Independent – 1964–65
- Carolinas Intercollegiate Athletic Conference – 1965–66 to 1971–72
- NAIA Independent – 1972–73 to 1988–89

NCAA Division II

- South Atlantic Conference – 1989–90 to 2006–07

NCAA Division I

- NCAA Division I Independent – 2007–08
- Big South Conference – 2008–09 to Present

== Postseason ==
=== CBI results ===
The Blue Hose have appeared in the College Basketball Invitational (CBI) twice. Their record is 0–2.

Year	Round	Opponent	Result
2024	First round	Montana	L 79–82^{OT}
2025	First round	Illinois State	L 70–78

=== CIT Results ===
The Blue Hose have appeared in the Division I CollegeInsider.com Postseason Tournament (CIT) one time. Their record is 2–1.

Year	Round	Opponent	Result
2019	First round Second Round; Quarterfinals	Seattle; Robert Morris; Marshall	W 73–68; W 77–70; L 66–83

=== NCAA Division II tournament results ===
The Blue Hose have appeared in the NCAA Division II tournament four times. Their combined record is 3–4.

Year	Round	Opponent	Result
1996	Regional Quarterfinals	High Point	L 67–76
1997	Regional semifinals	Elizabeth City State	L 64–76
2003	Regional Quarterfinals; Regional semifinals Regional Finals	Columbus State; Shaw; Bowie State	W 71–59; W 77–58; L 53–67
2006	Regional Quarterfinals; Regional semifinals	Armstrong Atlantic State; Georgia College & State	W 73–67; L 58–78

=== NAIA tournament results ===
The Blue Hose have appeared in the NAIA tournament one time. Their record is 0–1.

Year	Round	Opponent	Result
1993	First round	Georgetown (KY)	L 79–92
