= Campbell Fighting Camels men's basketball =

Campbell Fighting Camels
| 2026–27 Campbell Fighting Camels men's basketball team |
- University: Campbell University
- Head coach: Jimmie Williams (1st season)
- Location: Buies Creek, North Carolina
- Arena: John W. Pope Jr. Convocation Center (capacity: 3,095)
- Conference: Coastal Athletic Association
- Nickname: Fighting Camels
- Colors: Black and orange

NCAA Division I tournament appearances
- 1992

Conference tournament champions
- Big South: 1992

Conference regular-season champions
- A-Sun: 2010; Big South: 2019

Uniforms
| Home | Away |

The Campbell Fighting Camels men's basketball team is the men's basketball team that represent the Campbell University in Buies Creek, North Carolina. The school's team currently competes in the CAA and are led by head coach Jimmie Williams. The team's most recent, and only appearance in the NCAA Division I men's basketball tournament was in 1992. After struggling for several seasons, the Fighting Camels finally broke through in the 2009–2010 season. Campbell tied for first in the regular season Atlantic Sun standings. However, their bid for an NCAA tournament bid came up short, as they were eliminated in the Atlantic Sun Conference tournament.

== Postseason ==
=== NCAA tournament results ===
The Fighting Camels have appeared in one NCAA tournament. The Camels lost their only NCAA tournament game, 56–82, to eventual 1992 National Champion Duke.

| Year | Seed | Round | Opponent | Result |
|---|---|---|---|---|
| 1992 | #16 | First Round | #1 Duke | L 56–82 |

=== NIT results ===
The Fighting Camels have appeared in one National Invitation Tournament (NIT). Their combined record is 0–1.

| Year | Round | Opponent | Result |
|---|---|---|---|
| 2019 | First Round | UNC Greensboro | L 69–84 |

=== CIT results ===
The Fighting Camels have appeared in one CollegeInsider.com Postseason Tournament (CIT). Their record is 2–1.

| Year | Round | Opponent | Result |
|---|---|---|---|
| 2017 | First Round; Second Round; Quarterfinals | Houston Baptist; UT Martin; Furman | W 98–79; W 73–56; L 64–79 |

=== CBI results ===
The Fighting Camels have appeared in the College Basketball Invitational (CBI) one time. Their record is 2–1.

| Year | Round | Opponent | Result |
|---|---|---|---|
| 2018 | First Round; Quarterfinals; Semifinals | Miami (OH); New Orleans; San Francisco | W 97–87; W 71–69; L 62–65 |

=== NAIA tournament results ===
The Fighting Camels have appeared in the NAIA tournament two times. Their combined record is 4–2.

| Year | Round | Opponent | Result |
|---|---|---|---|
| 1970 | First Round | Jackson State | L 65–89 |
| 1977 | First Round; Second Round; Quarterfinals; Semifinals; National Championship Game | Lincoln Memorial; Southwestern Oklahoma State; Alcorn State; Henderson State; Texas Southern | W 76–75; W 71–56; W 77–63; W 76–52; L 44–71 |

== Home venues ==
=== Primary ===
- Carter Gymnasium (1953–2008)
- John W. Pope, Jr. Convocation Center (2008–present)

=== Other ===
- Cumberland County Civic Center in Fayetteville, North Carolina (116 games; 1968–1997)
- Raleigh Civic Center in Raleigh, North Carolina (19 games; 1978–1982)
- Crown Coliseum in Fayetteville, North Carolina (4 games; 1997–1999)
- Harnett Central HS (6 games; 1977–1980)
- South Johnston HS (2 games; 1976–1977)
- Cape Fear HS (1 game; 1969–1970)

== Camels in the NBA ==
- Chris Clemons
- George Lehmann

== Camels in international professional basketball ==
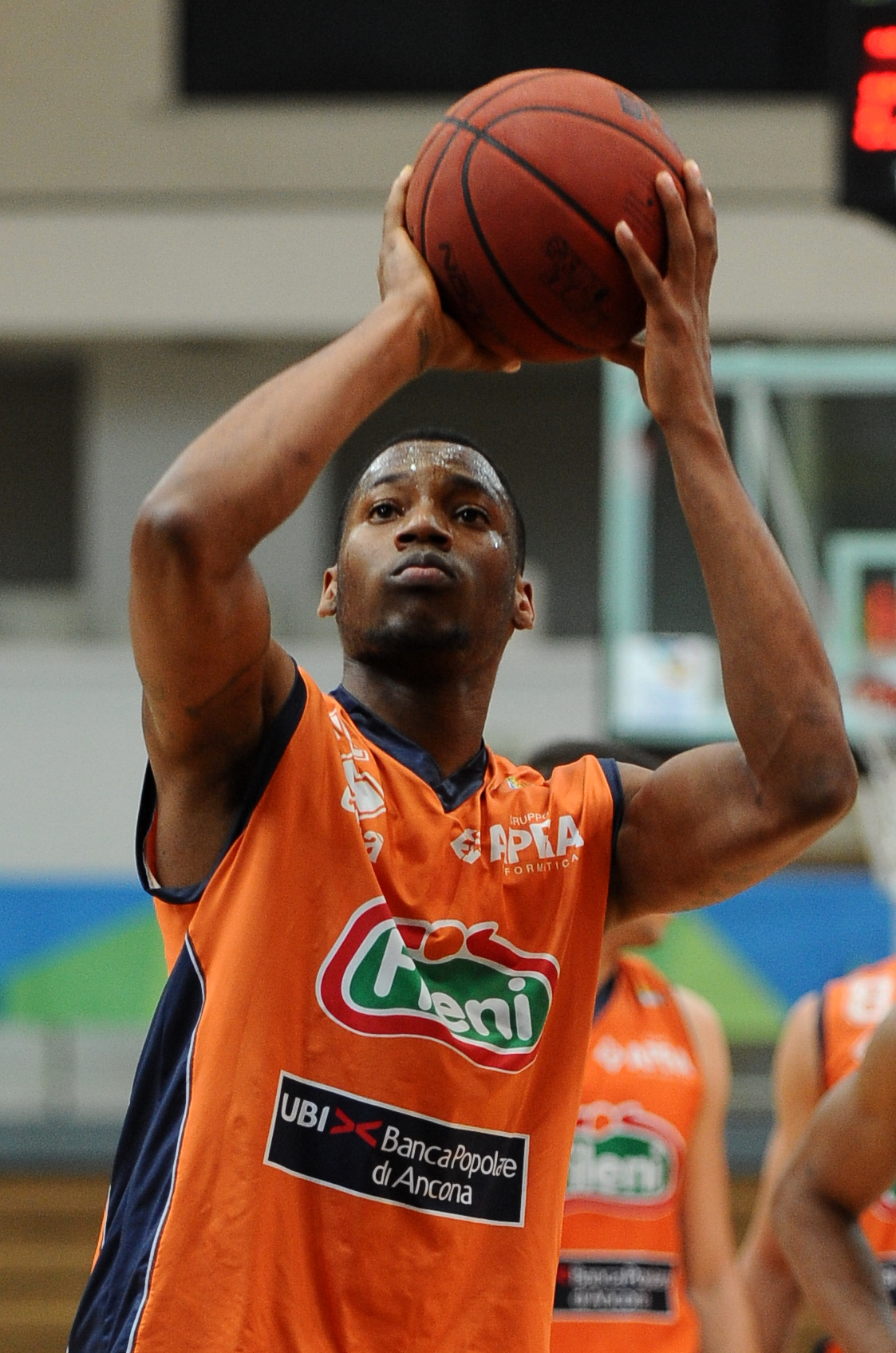
Eric Griffin

- Eric Griffin (born 1990), basketball player in the Israeli Basketball Premier League

== Retired numbers ==
On January 16, 2020, the Fighting Camels retired former player Chris Clemons' number 3.

Campbell Fighting Camels retired numbers
| No. | Player | Career | Year retired |
| 3 | Chris Clemons | 2015–2019 | 2020 |

== Season records ==
- Records incomplete before 1951

| Season | Head coach | Overall record | Conf. record | Postseason |
Junior College Status
| 1951–52 | Earl Smith | 18–6 | | |
| 1952–53 | Earl Smith | 11–14 | | |
| 1953–54 | Fred McCall | 17–6 | | |
| 1954–55 | Fred McCall | 23–3 | | |
| 1955–56 | Fred McCall | 23–2 | | |
| 1956–57 | Fred McCall | 9–11 | | |
| 1957–58 | Fred McCall | 17–7 | | |
| 1958–59 | Fred McCall | 12–11 | | |
| 1959–60 | Fred McCall | 16–7 | | |
| 1960–61 | Fred McCall | 16–7 | | |
Senior College Status NAIA
| 1961–62 | Fred McCall | 16–7 | | |
| 1962–63 | Fred McCall | 11–13 | | |
| 1963–64 | Fred McCall | 17–11 | | |
| 1964–65 | Fred McCall | 11–16 | | |
| 1965–66 | Fred McCall | 10–15 | | |
| 1966–67 | Fred McCall | 10–17 | | |
| 1967–68 | Fred McCall | 16–10 | | |
| 1968–69 | Fred McCall & Danny Roberts | 20–10 | | |
| 1969–70 | Danny Roberts | 24–7 | | |
| 1970–71 | Danny Roberts | 15–12 | | |
| 1971–72 | Danny Roberts | 18–11 | | |
| 1972–73 | Danny Roberts | 16–11 | | |
| 1973–74 | Danny Roberts | 9–19 | | |
| 1974–75 | Danny Roberts | 25–6 | | |
| 1975–76 | Danny Roberts | 23–4 | | |
| 1976–77 | Danny Roberts | 23–10 | | |
NCAA Division I Independent
| 1977–78 | Danny Roberts | 9–15 | | |
| 1978–79 | Danny Roberts | 10–16 | | |
| 1979–80 | Danny Roberts | 15–12 | | |
| 1980–81 | Danny Roberts | 11–16 | | |
| 1981–82 | Danny Roberts | 11–16 | | |
| 1982–83 | Danny Roberts | 11–17 | | |
| 1983–84 | Jerry Smith | 10–18 | | |
| 1984–85 | Jerry Smith | 5–22 | | |
Big South Conference (First Tenure)
| 1985–86 | Billy Lee | 8–19 | 3–5 | |
| 1986–87 | Billy Lee | 17–13 | 10–4 | |
| 1987–88 | Billy Lee | 11–16 | 3–9 | |
| 1988–89 | Billy Lee | 18–12 | 8–4 | |
| 1989–90 | Billy Lee | 15–13 | 7–5 | |
| 1990–91 | Billy Lee | 9–19 | 3–11 | |
| 1991–92 | Billy Lee | 19–12 | 7–7 | NCAA first round |
| 1992–93 | Billy Lee | 12–15 | 10–6 | |
| 1993–94 | Billy Lee | 20–9 | 12–4 | |
Atlantic Sun Conference
| 1994–95 | Billy Lee | 8–18 | 4–12 | |
| 1995–96 | Billy Lee | 17–11 | 11–5 | |
| 1996–97 | Billy Lee | 11–16 | 8–8 | |
| 1997–98 | Billy Lee | 10–17 | 4–12 | |
| 1998–99 | Billy Lee | 9–18 | 6–10 | |
| 1999–2000 | Billy Lee | 12–16 | 10–8 | |
| 2000–01 | Billy Lee | 7–21 | 5–13 | |
| 2001–02 | Billy Lee | 8–19 | 6–14 | |
| 2002–03 | Billy Lee | 5–22 | 1–15 | |
| 2003–04 | Robbie Laing | 3–24 | 3–17 | |
| 2004–05 | Robbie Laing | 2–25 | 0–20 | |
| 2005–06 | Robbie Laing | 10–18 | 9–11 | |
| 2006–07 | Robbie Laing | 14–17 | 7–11 | |
| 2007–08 | Robbie Laing | 10–20 | 5–11 | |
| 2008–09 | Robbie Laing | 14–16 | 11–9 | |
| 2009–10 | Robbie Laing | 19–11 | 14–6 | |
| 2010–11 | Robbie Laing | 12–19 | 6–14 | |
Big South Conference (Second Tenure)
| 2011–12 | Robbie Laing | 17–15 | 11–7 | |
| 2012–13 | Robbie Laing | 13–20 | 7–9 | |
| 2013–14 | Kevin McGeehan | 12–20 | 6–10 | |
| 2014–15 | Kevin McGeehan | 10–22 | 4–14 | |
| 2015–16 | Kevin McGeehan | 12–18 | 5–13 | |
| 2016–17 | Kevin McGeehan | 19–18 | 7–11 | CIT Quarterfinals |
| 2017–18 | Kevin McGeehan | 18–16 | 10–8 | CBI Semifinals |
| 2018–19 | Kevin McGeehan | 20–13 | 12–4 | NIT First Round |
| 2019–20 | Kevin McGeehan | 15–16 | 6–12 | |
| 2020–21 | Kevin McGeehan | 17–10 | 11–6 | |
| 2021–22 | Kevin McGeehan | 16–13 | 8–8 | |
| 2022–23 | Kevin McGeehan | 16–18 | 8–10 | |
Coastal Athletic Association
| 2023–24 | Kevin McGeehan | 14–18 | 8–10 | |
TOTAL OVERALL RECORD: 961–989 (.493)
TOTAL JUNIOR COLLEGE RECORD: 162–74 (.686)
TOTAL NAIA RECORD: 264–179 (.596)
TOTAL NCAA DIVISION I RECORD: 535–736 (.421)
