= Radford Highlanders men's basketball =

American collegiate men's basketball team

2026–27 Radford Highlanders men's basketball team
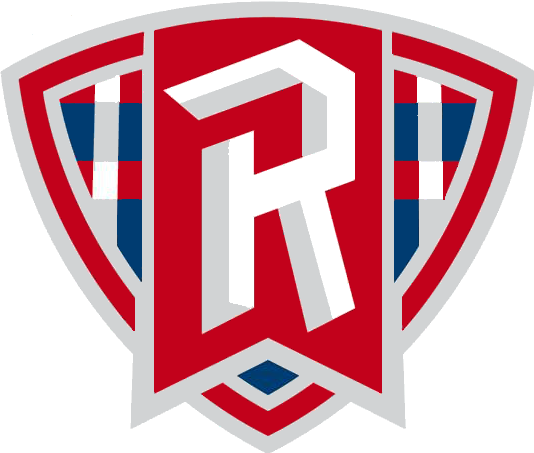
- University: Radford University
- Head coach: Zach Chu (2nd season)
- Location: Radford, Virginia
- Arena: Dedmon Center (capacity: 3,000)
- Conference: Big South
- Nickname: Highlanders
- Colors: Red, gray, and white
- Student section: Radford Rowdies

NCAA Division I tournament appearances
- 1998, 2009, 2018

Conference tournament champions
- 1998, 2009, 2018

Conference regular-season champions
- 1992, 2000, 2001, 2009, 2019, 2020

Uniforms
Home	Away

The Radford Highlanders men's basketball represents Radford University in NCAA Division I intercollegiate men's basketball competition. A member of the Big South Conference, their current head coach is Zach Chu. The Highlanders play at the Dedmon Center, which has a capacity of 3,000. The Highlanders have appeared three times in the NCAA Tournament, most recently in 2018.

== Postseason ==
=== NCAA tournament results ===
Radford has appeared in three NCAA Tournaments. The Highlanders have a record of 1–3. Their 2018 win in the opening round was the second and, as of 2022, most recent win by a Big South team in the tournament.

Year	Seed	Round	Opponent	Result
1998	#16	First Round	#1 Duke	L 63–99
2009	#16	First Round	#1 North Carolina	L 58–101
2018	#16	First Four; First Round	#16 LIU Brooklyn #1 Villanova	W 71–61; L 61–87

=== CBI results ===
The Highlanders have appeared in the College Basketball Invitational (CBI) three times. Their combined record is 4–3.

Year	Round	Opponent	Result
2014	First Round; Quarterfinals	Oregon State; Old Dominion	W 96–92; L 59–82
2015	First Round; Quarterfinals	Delaware State; Vermont	W 78–57; L 71–78
2023	First Round; Quarterfinals; Semifinals	Tarleton State; San Jose State; Charlotte	W 72–70^{OT} W 67–57; L 56–63

== Notable players ==
=== Steve Robinson (1978–1980) ===
Steve Robinson was one of the first scholarship athletes ever at Radford University. Robinson was a two-year starter and co-captain for the men's basketball team from 1978–80, averaging 10.8 points and 5.8 rebounds in 54 games. Robinson averaged 11.5 points and 6.8 rebounds during one of Radford's greatest seasons ever, the 23–4 year in 1978–79, under coach Joe Davis. He hit 51.7 percent of his field goals, and later distinguished himself as an assistant coach at RU from 1983–86. The Roanoke native earned both his bachelor's ('81) and master's ('85) degrees from Radford, and has gone on to great success as a collegiate head coach. Robinson led the University of Tulsa to three consecutive NCAA Tournament appearances before landing the head coaching position at Florida State University. At Florida State, Robinson led the Noles to 3 NCAA tournament appearances. Robinson is currently an assistant coach with the Arizona Wildcats.

=== David Smith (1981–1985) ===
Smith finished his sterling four-year basketball career from 1981–1985 as the school's all-time leading scorer and rebounder. In the process, the 6–5 Amherst, Va., native keyed Radford's move from NAIA competition to NCAA Division II play and then Division I. A fierce competitor, Smith started each of Radford's 107 games during his career and shot 52.7 percent from the field. He scored 1,313 points and pulled down 739 rebounds, leading the team in rebounding and field goal percentage three years. Remaining active at his alma mater, Smith has served on the Athletic Association Advisory Council and on the National Alumni Association Executive Council.

=== Ron Shelburne (1988–1991) ===
Shelburne, a native of nearby Snowville, Va., became only the fourth Radford men's basketball player to score more than 1,000 points and grab more than 500 rebounds in a career. A three-time team Most Valuable Player, he led the Highlanders in scoring in 1989–90 and earned Big South All-Conference honors in 1990–91. He never missed a game during his four-year career, playing in 116 consecutive contests. He averaged 11.5 points per game and shot 51.8 percent from the field, and 75.3 percent from the fre throw line during his career, gaining a reputation as a clutch performer. Shelburne finished in 1991 as the school's all-time leading scorer with 1,332 points.

=== Doug Day (1989–1993) ===
Doug Day completed his Radford career as the NCAA Division I career leader in three-point baskets made. He sank 401 three-pointers during his career from 1989–1993, and left RU as the school's all-time leading scorer with 2,027 points. Day led the nation in three-point baskets per game with 4.03 per contest, and earned All-Big South honors during each of his four seasons at RU. He averaged 17.3 ppg for his career, and left Radford ranked second on the Big South Conference career scoring chart. Day's offensive prowess helped RU to back-to-back 20-win seasons in 1990–91 and 1991–92, and to the Highlanders' first regular season conference crown in 1991–92. Day earned a degree in education from RU in 1993.

=== Art Parakhouski (2008–2010) ===
Despite only playing two seasons at Radford, Artsiom Parakhouski won the Big South Player of the Year twice. His senior season he led the nation in rebounds per game with a 13.35 rebounds per game average. Art finished his career with the 3rd most Rebounds in Radford History (10th in Big South History). Art led Radford to the 2008–09 Big South Conference regular season championship as well as the Big South Tournament Championship. Art led Radford to its second NCAA Tournament bid.

=== Javonte Green (2011–2015) ===
Javonte Green played for four seasons as a member of the Radford Highlanders. Green entered the starting lineup as a freshman, averaging 10.2 points, 6.7 rebounds and 1.4 steals per game and was named to the Big South Conference's All-Newcomer team. As a sophomore, his first full season as a starter, Green led the Highlanders with 14.6 points and 8.1 rebounds per game and was named Second Team All-Big South. He was named First Team All-Big South after averaged 16.9 points, 8.1 rebounds and 1.9 steals per game while setting the school single season record for steals with 68 in his junior season. As a senior, Green averaged 15.4 points, nine rebounds, and 1.9 steals and was again named First Team All-Big South as well as the conference Defensive Player of the Year. Green finished his collegiate career as Radford's career leader in rebounds (1,064), steals (245), and games played (133) and second all-time in scoring with 1,911 points.
