= 2017–18 UTEP Miners men's basketball team =

American college basketball season

2017–18 UTEP Miners men's basketball
- Conference: Conference USA
- Record: 11–20 (6–12 C-USA)
- Head coach: Tim Floyd (First 6 games); Phil Johnson (interim)
- Assistant coaches: Bobby Braswell; Kris Baumann
- Home arena: Don Haskins Center

2017–18 Conference USA men's basketball standings
	Conf.				Overall
Team	W		L	PCT	W		L	PCT
Middle Tennessee	16	–	2	.889	25	–	8	.758
Old Dominion	15	–	3	.833	25	–	7	.781
Western Kentucky	14	–	4	.778	27	–	11	.711
Marshall †	12	–	6	.667	25	–	11	.694
UTSA	11	–	7	.611	20	–	15	.571
UAB	10	–	8	.556	20	–	13	.606
North Texas	8	–	10	.444	20	–	18	.526
FIU	8	–	10	.444	14	–	18	.438
Southern Miss	7	–	11	.389	16	–	18	.471
Louisiana Tech	7	–	11	.389	17	–	16	.515
Florida Atlantic	6	–	12	.333	12	–	19	.387
UTEP	6	–	12	.333	11	–	20	.355
Rice	4	–	14	.222	7	–	24	.226
Charlotte	2	–	16	.111	6	–	23	.207
† 2018 C-USA Tournament winner

The 2017–18 UTEP Miners basketball team represented the University of Texas at El Paso during the 2017–18 NCAA Division I men's basketball season. The Miners, led by interim head coach Phil Johnson, played their home games at the Don Haskins Center as members of Conference USA. They finished the season 11–20, 6–12 in C-USA play to finish in a tie for 11th place. They lost in the first round of the C-USA tournament to UTSA. UTEP averaged 6,155 fans per game.

Following a loss to Lamar on November 27, 2017, that saw the Miners drop to 1–5 on the season, head coach Tim Floyd announced that he was retiring effective immediately. The school had previously announced a new athletic director, Jim Senter, a week prior, but Floyd said that had nothing to do with his decision. Assistant Phil Johnson was named interim head coach of the Miners the next day. On March 12, 2018, the school hired Fresno State head coach Rodney Terry as the new head coach of the Miners.

== Previous season ==
The Miners finished the 2016–17 season 15–17, 12–6 in C-USA play to finish in a tie for third place. In the C-USA tournament, they defeated Rice in the quarterfinals before losing to top-seeded Middle Tennessee in the semifinals.

== Offseason ==
=== Departures ===
Name	Number	Pos.	Height	Weight	Year	Hometown	Reason for departure
Dominic Artis	1	G	6'3"	190	Senior	San Francisco, CA	Graduated
Tim Cameron	3	G	6'4"	180	Freshman	Norcross, GA	Transferred to High Point
Adrian Moore	4	G	6'4"	175	Freshman	Little Rock, AR	Transferred to Butler CC
Chris Barnes	5	G	6'3"	180	Sophomore	Compton, CA	Transferred to Angelina College
Terry Winn	12	F	6'7"	230	RS Sophomore	Monroe, LA	Transferred to Texas–Rio Grande Valley
Ivan Venegas	13	F	6'8"	230	Sophomore	Chihuahua, Mexico	Walk-on; left the for personal reasons
Deon Barrett	23	G	5'10"	150	Freshman	Lancaster, TX	Transferred to Texas–Arlington
Hudson Urbanus	25	G	6'0"	160	Freshman	Austin, TX	Walk-on; left the for personal reasons

=== Incoming transfers ===
Name	Number	Pos.	Height	Weight	Year	Hometown	Previous School
Keith Frazier	25	G	6'5"	190	RS Senior	Dallas, TX	Transferred from North Texas. Will eligible to play since Frazier graduated from North Texas.

=== Class of 2017 recruits ===
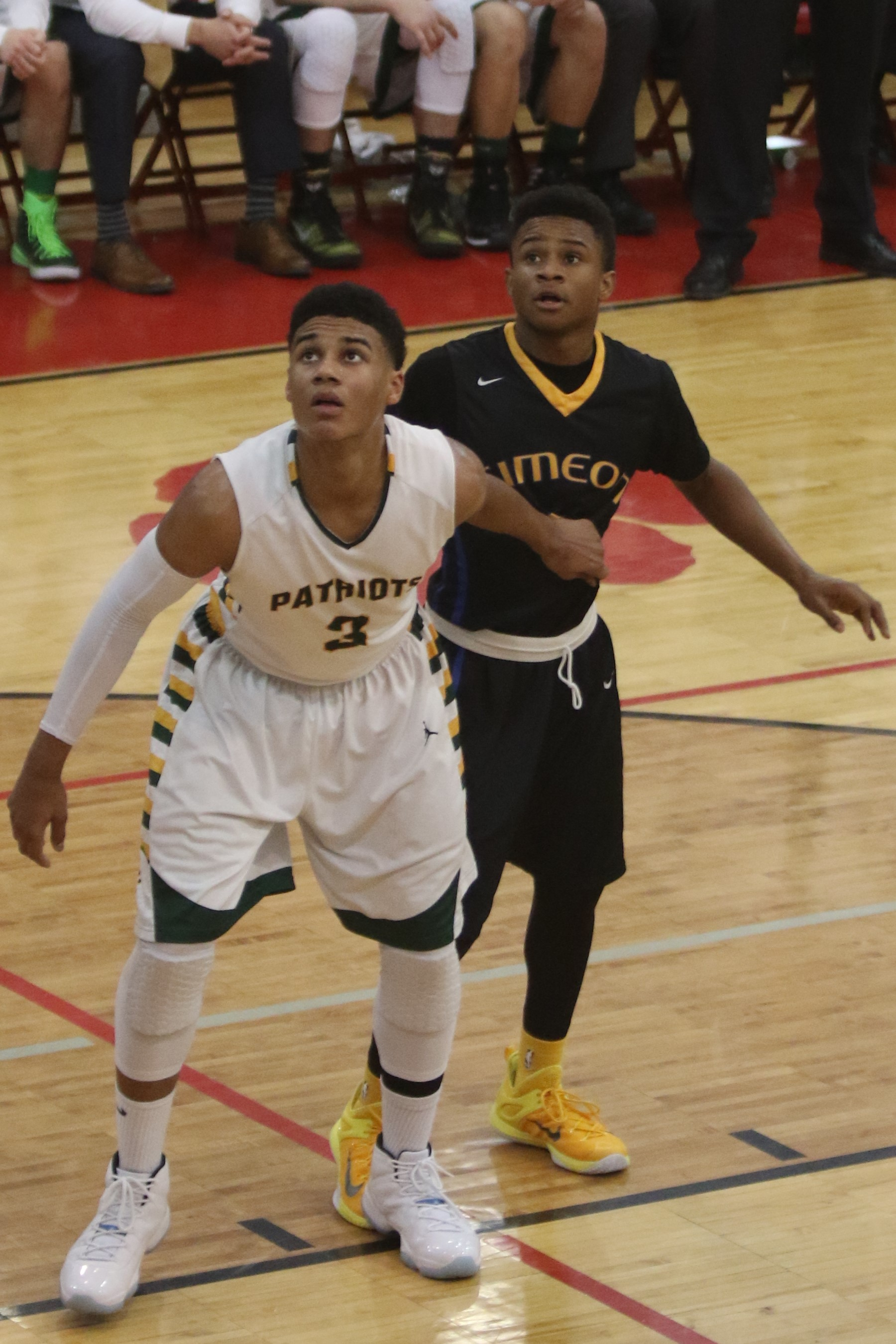
Justin Smith of Stevenson High School boxes out Evan Gilyard of Simeon Career Academy in 2015.

College recruiting information
Name	Hometown	School	Height	Weight	Commit date
Evan Gilyard #54 PG	Chicago, IL	Simeon Career Academy	5 ft 8 in (1.73 m)	N/A	Oct 7, 2016
Evan Gilyard #54 PG	Recruit ratings: Scout: Rivals: (75)				
Kobe Magee; PG	San Antonio, TX	Brandeis High School	6 ft 0 in (1.83 m)	N/A	Feb 27, 2016
Kobe Magee; PG	Recruit ratings: Scout: Rivals: (0)				
Tirus Smith; SF	Petal, MS	Petal High School	6 ft 8 in (2.03 m)	180 lb (82 kg)	Oct 19, 2016
Tirus Smith; SF	Recruit ratings: Scout: Rivals: (0)				
Overall recruit ranking:
Note: In many cases, Scout, Rivals, 247Sports, On3, and ESPN may conflict in their listings of height and weight.; In these cases, the average was taken. ESPN grades are on a 100-point scale.; Sources: "2017 Team Ranking". Rivals.

=== Class of 2018 recruits ===
College recruiting information (2018)
Name	Hometown	School	Height	Weight	Commit date
Jacob Eyman; PF	Los Alamitos, CA	Los Alamitos High School	6 ft 8 in (2.03 m)	205 lb (93 kg)	Sep 10, 2017
Jacob Eyman; PF	Recruit ratings: Scout: Rivals: (NR)				
Teddy Ochieng; PF	Kenya	Cantwell Sacred Heart Of Mary	6 ft 8 in (2.03 m)	N/A	Oct 29, 2017
Teddy Ochieng; PF	Recruit ratings: Scout: Rivals: (NR)				
Avery Martinez; SG	Costa Rica	Cantwell Sacred Heart Of Mary	6 ft 5 in (1.96 m)	165 lb (75 kg)	Oct 29, 2017
Avery Martinez; SG	Recruit ratings: Scout: Rivals: (NR)				
Lamar Norman Jr. SG	Wyoming, MI	Godwin Heights High School	6 ft 2 in (1.88 m)	170 lb (77 kg)	Nov 1, 2017
Lamar Norman Jr. SG	Recruit ratings: Scout: Rivals: (NR)				
Overall recruit ranking:
Note: In many cases, Scout, Rivals, 247Sports, On3, and ESPN may conflict in their listings of height and weight.; In these cases, the average was taken. ESPN grades are on a 100-point scale.; Sources: "2018 Team Ranking". Rivals.

== Roster ==
2017–18 UTEP Miners men's basketball team
Players
Coaches

Pos.	#	Name	Height	Weight	Year	Previous school	Hometown
F	1	Paul Thomas	6 ft 8 in (2.03 m)	210 lb (95 kg)	Jr	Summer Creek HS	Humble, TX
G	2	Omega Harris	6 ft 2 in (1.88 m)	175 lb (79 kg)	Sr	Putnam City West HS	Bethany, OK
G	3	Evan Gilyard	5 ft 10 in (1.78 m)	155 lb (70 kg)	Fr	Simeon Career Academy	Chicago, IL
F/C	4	Tirus Smith	6 ft 9 in (2.06 m)	250 lb (113 kg)	Fr	Petal HS	Richton, MS
G/F	5	Trey Wade	6 ft 6 in (1.98 m)	205 lb (93 kg)	Fr	South Cobb HS	Marietta, GA
F	11	Jake Flaggert	6 ft 7 in (2.01 m)	210 lb (95 kg)	RS Sr	Lovejoy HS	Lucas, TX
G	13	Isiah Osborne	6 ft 5 in (1.96 m)	180 lb (82 kg)	So	University of Windsor (Canada)	Windsor, ON
G	15	Kobe Magee	6 ft 1 in (1.85 m)	150 lb (68 kg)	Fr	Brandeis HS	San Antonio, TX
G	21	Trey Touchet	6 ft 2 in (1.88 m)	190 lb (86 kg)	RS Jr	Saint Thomas More HS	Lafayette, IN
G	24	DeShaun Highler (W)	6 ft 2 in (1.88 m)	165 lb (75 kg)	Fr	JW North HS	Riverside, CA
G	25	Keith Frazier	6 ft 5 in (1.96 m)	190 lb (86 kg)	RS Sr	Kimball HS; SMU/North Texas	Dallas, TX
C	41	Matt Willms	7 ft 1 in (2.16 m)	235 lb (107 kg)	RS Sr	Findlay Prep	Leamington, ON
F	54	Isaiah Rhyanes (W)	6 ft 9 in (2.06 m)	210 lb (95 kg)	Jr	Andress HS; El Paso CC	El Paso, TX

Head coach

- Phil Johnson (East Central)

Assistant coach(es)

- Bobby Braswell (Cal State Northridge)
- Kris Baumann (Idaho)

Legend

- (C) Team captain
- (S) Suspended
- (I) Ineligible
- (W) Walk-on
- Injured
- Current redshirt

Roster

== Schedule and results ==
Date time, TV	Rank^{#}	Opponent^{#}	Result	Record	Site (attendance) city, state
Exhibition
Oct 28, 2017*; 1:00 pm		Sul Ross State	W 78–70		Don Haskins Center; El Paso, TX
Nov 3, 2017*; 7:00 pm		Western New Mexico	W 98–50		Don Haskins Center; El Paso, TX
Non-conference regular season
Nov 10, 2017*; 7:00 pm		Louisiana College	W 100–50	1–0	Don Haskins Center (5,835); El Paso, TX
Nov 16, 2017*; 12:00 pm, ESPNU		vs. Boise State; Puerto Rico Tip-Off quarterfinals	L 56–58	1–1	HTC Center (701); Conway, SC
Nov 17, 2017*; 8:30 am, ESPNU		vs. South Carolina; Puerto Rico Tip-Off consolation 2nd round	L 56–80	1–2	HTC Center (987); Conway, SC
Nov 19, 2017*; 9:30 am, ESPN3		vs. Appalachian State; Puerto Rico Tip-Off 7th place game	L 72–76	1–3	HTC Center (1,774); Conway, SC
Nov 25, 2017*; 7:00 pm		at New Mexico State; Battle of I-10	L 63–72	1–4	Pan American Center (6,069); Las Cruces, NM
Nov 27, 2017*; 7:00 pm		Lamar	L 52–66	1–5	Don Haskins Center (5,855); El Paso, TX
Nov 30, 2017*; 8:00 pm, Stadium		New Mexico State; Battle of I-10	L 60–80	1–6	Don Haskins Center (7,078); El Paso, TX
Dec 2, 2017*; 7:00 pm		New Mexico	W 88–76	2–6	Don Haskins Center (6,394); El Paso, TX
Dec 9, 2017*; 7:00 pm, Stadium		Washington State	W 76–69	3–6	Don Haskins Center (6,341); El Paso, TX
Dec 19, 2017*; 7:00 pm		Incarnate Word	W 72–66	4–6	Don Haskins Center (6,023); El Paso, TX
Dec 21, 2017*; 7:00 pm		Howard; Sun Bowl Invitational semifinals	W 69–56	5–6	Don Haskins Center (6,013); El Paso, TX
Dec 22, 2017*; 7:00 pm		North Dakota State; Sun Bowl Invitational championship	L 51–63	5–7	Don Haskins Center (8,021); El Paso, TX
Conference USA regular season
Dec 28, 2017; 7:00 pm		North Texas	L 62–63	5–8 (0–1)	Don Haskins Center (6,306); El Paso, TX
Dec 30, 2017; 7:00 pm		Rice	W 80–62	6–8 (1–1)	Don Haskins Center (6,147); El Paso, TX
Jan 4, 2018; 6:00 pm, beIN		at Southern Miss	L 75–85	6–9 (1–2)	Reed Green Coliseum (1,956); Hattiesburg, MS
Jan 6, 2018; 5:00 pm		at Louisiana Tech	L 88–97	6–10 (1–3)	Thomas Assembly Center (3,654); Ruston, LA
Jan 11, 2018; 7:00 pm		Florida Atlantic	L 66–73	6–11 (1–4)	Don Haskins Center (5,643); El Paso, TX
Jan 13, 2018; 7:00 pm		FIU	W 72–68	7–11 (2–4)	Don Haskins Center (6,074); El Paso, TX
Jan 20, 2018; 2:00 pm		at UTSA	L 61–65	7–12 (2–5)	Convocation Center (2,210); San Antonio, TX
Jan 25, 2018; 6:00 pm, Stadium		at UAB	L 78–85	7–13 (2–6)	Bartow Arena (3,013); Birmingham, AL
Jan 27, 2018; 5:00 pm		at Middle Tennessee	L 50–81	7–14 (2–7)	Murphy Center (5,227); Murfreesboro, TN
Feb 1, 2018; 8:00 pm, CBSSN		Western Kentucky	L 60–72	7–15 (2–8)	Don Haskins Center (6,116); El Paso, TX
Feb 3, 2018; 7:00 pm		Marshall	L 65–74	7–16 (2–9)	Don Haskins Center (6,061); El Paso, TX
Feb 10, 2018; 7:00 pm		UTSA	L 59–63	7–17 (2–10)	Don Haskins Center (6,335); El Paso, TX
Feb 15, 2018; 5:00 pm		at Charlotte	W 87–86	8–17 (3–10)	Dale F. Halton Arena (3,059); Charlotte, NC
Feb 17, 2018; 5:00 pm, ESPN3		at Old Dominion	L 33–82	8–18 (3–11)	Ted Constant Convocation Center (6,902); Norfolk, VA
Feb 22, 2018; 7:00 pm		Louisiana Tech	W 74–72	9–18 (4–11)	Don Haskins Center (5,386); El Paso, TX
Feb 24, 2018; 7:00 pm		Southern Miss	W 73–44	10–18 (5–11)	Don Haskins Center (6,117); El Paso, TX
Mar 1, 2018; 6:00 pm		at Rice	L 70–76	10–19 (5–12)	Tudor Fieldhouse (1,802); Houston, TX
Mar 3, 2018; 4:00 pm		at North Texas	W 68–66	11–19 (6–12)	The Super Pit (3,744); Denton, TX
Conference USA tournament
Mar 7, 2018; 6:30 pm, Stadium	(12)	vs. (5) UTSA; First Round	L 58–71	11–20	The Ford Center at The Star; Frisco, TX
*Non-conference game. ^{#}Rankings from AP Poll. (#) Tournament seedings in parentheses. All times are in Mountain Time.

== See also ==
- 2017–18 UTEP Miners women's basketball team
