= 2017–18 FIU Panthers men's basketball team =

American college basketball season

2017–18 FIU Panthers men's basketball
- Conference: Conference USA
- Record: 14–18 (8–10 C-USA)
- Head coach: Anthony Evans (5th season)
- Assistant coaches: Mike Gillian; Spencer Wright; Jarrett T. Lockhart
- Home arena: FIU Arena

2017–18 Conference USA men's basketball standings
	Conf.				Overall
Team	W		L	PCT	W		L	PCT
Middle Tennessee	16	–	2	.889	25	–	8	.758
Old Dominion	15	–	3	.833	25	–	7	.781
Western Kentucky	14	–	4	.778	27	–	11	.711
Marshall †	12	–	6	.667	25	–	11	.694
UTSA	11	–	7	.611	20	–	15	.571
UAB	10	–	8	.556	20	–	13	.606
North Texas	8	–	10	.444	20	–	18	.526
FIU	8	–	10	.444	14	–	18	.438
Southern Miss	7	–	11	.389	16	–	18	.471
Louisiana Tech	7	–	11	.389	17	–	16	.515
Florida Atlantic	6	–	12	.333	12	–	19	.387
UTEP	6	–	12	.333	11	–	20	.355
Rice	4	–	14	.222	7	–	24	.226
Charlotte	2	–	16	.111	6	–	23	.207
† 2018 C-USA Tournament winner

The 2017–18 FIU Panthers men's basketball team represented Florida International University during the 2017–18 NCAA Division I men's basketball season. The Panthers, led by fifth-year head coach Anthony Evans, played their home games at FIU Arena in Miami, Florida as members of Conference USA. They finished the season 14–18, 8–10 in C-USA play to finish in a tie for seventh place. They lost in the first round of the C-USA tournament to Southern Miss.

On April 2, 2018, FIU fired head coach Anthony Evans after five seasons. On April 20, the school announced VCU associate head coach Jeremy Ballard was hired as the new head coach.

== Previous season ==
The Panthers finished the 2016–17 season 7–24, 3–15 in C-USA play to finish in 13th place. They failed to qualify for the C-USA tournament.

== Offseason ==
=== Departures ===
Name	Number	Pos.	Height	Weight	Year	Hometown	Reason for departure
Michael Kessens	0	F	6'9"	228	RS Senior	Nyon, Switzerland	Graduated
Elmo Stephen	1	F	6'7"	200	Senior	Auburndale, FL	Graduated
Donte McGill	2	G	6'3"	185	Senior	Newark, DE	Graduated
Kimar Williams	4	G	6'1"	170	Sophomore	Philadelphia, PA	Transferred to Rider
Anthony Boswell	11	G	6'6"	205	Senior	Bronx, NY	Graduated
Eric Nottage	12	G	6'2"	180	Senior	Miami, FL	Graduated
Richard Bievens	20	F	6'9"	205	Junior	Bakersfield, CA	Graduate transferred to Slippery Rock (PA)
Cameron Smith	24	F	6'7"	210	Junior	Tallahassee, FL	Graduate transferred to James Madison

=== Incoming transfers ===
Name	Number	Pos.	Height	Weight	Year	Hometown	Previous School
Josh Stamps	0	G	6'5"	180	Junior	Chicago, IL	Junior college transferred from Trinity Valley CC
Trejon Jacob	3	G	6'4"		Sophomore	Raleigh, NC	Junior college transferred from Seminole State College
Brian Beard Jr.	4	G	5'10"	175	Junior	Rancho Cucamonga, CA	Junior college transferred from Chaffey College
Willy Nunez	20	G	6'6"		Junior	Orlando, FL	Junior college transferred from Indian River State College
Elhadji Dieng	22	C	6'11"	230	Junior	Senegal	Junior college transferred from Sheridan College

=== Recruiting class of 2017 ===
College recruiting information
Name	Hometown	School	Height	Weight	Commit date
Cordell Veira; PG	Etobioke, ON	John Polanyi Collegiate Inst	6 ft 4 in (1.93 m)	190 lb (86 kg)	Feb 26, 2017
Cordell Veira; PG	Recruit ratings: Scout: Rivals: (NR)				
Kasper Christiansen; PF	Woodstock, VA	Massanutten Military Academy	6 ft 10 in (2.08 m)	210 lb (95 kg)	
Kasper Christiansen; PF	Recruit ratings: Scout: Rivals: (NR)				
Isaiah Banks; SG	Conyers, GA	Heritage High School	6 ft 6 in (1.98 m)	180 lb (82 kg)	
Isaiah Banks; SG	Recruit ratings: Scout: Rivals: (NR)				
Overall recruit ranking:
Note: In many cases, Scout, Rivals, 247Sports, On3, and ESPN may conflict in their listings of height and weight.; In these cases, the average was taken. ESPN grades are on a 100-point scale.; Sources: "2017 Team Ranking". Rivals.

== Roster ==
2017–18 FIU Panthers men's basketball team
Players
Coaches

Pos.	#	Name	Height	Weight	Year	Previous school	Hometown
G	0	Josh Stamps	6 ft 5 in (1.96 m)	180 lb (82 kg)	Jr	Curie Metropolitan; Trinity Valley CC	Chicago, IL
G	1	Isaiah Banks	6 ft 5 in (1.96 m)	180 lb (82 kg)	Fr	Heritage	Conyers, GA
G	2	Cordell Veira	6 ft 4 in (1.93 m)	190 lb (86 kg)	Fr	John Polanyi Collegiate Inst	Etobicoke, ON
G	3	Trejon Jacob	6 ft 5 in (1.96 m)	175 lb (79 kg)	So	Millbrook; Seminole State College	Raleigh, NC
G	4	Brian Beard Jr.	5 ft 10 in (1.78 m)	180 lb (82 kg)	Jr	Rancho Cucamonga; Chipola College	Ranch Cucamonga, CA
G	5	Eric Lockett	6 ft 5 in (1.96 m)	193 lb (88 kg)	RS Jr	Whitefield Academy; George Mason/Chipola College	Atlanta, GA
F	10	Hassan Hussein	6 ft 9 in (2.06 m)	205 lb (93 kg)	RS Jr	Mt. Zion Prep	Lorton, VA
G	20	Willy Nunez Jr.	6 ft 6 in (1.98 m)	185 lb (84 kg)	Jr	Oak Rige; Indian River State College	Orlando, FL
F	21	Kasper Christiansen	6 ft 10 in (2.08 m)	210 lb (95 kg)	Fr	Massanutten Military Acad (VA)	Frederiksberg, Denmark
C	22	Elhadji Dieng	6 ft 11 in (2.11 m)	245 lb (111 kg)	Jr	Canarias Basketball Academy; Sheridan College/New Mexico JC	Mbour, Senegal
G	23	Ronald Whitaker	6 ft 7 in (2.01 m)	192 lb (87 kg)	Sr	Riverdale Baptist; Gulf Coast CC/SW Tennessee CC	Washington, D.C.
F	31	Michael Douglas	6 ft 5 in (1.96 m)	190 lb (86 kg)	Jr	Sachse	Sachse, TX
F	32	Jay Harvey	6 ft 9 in (2.06 m)	246 lb (112 kg)	RS Jr	TF North; Shawnee CC	Chicago, IL
F	34	Osasumwen Osaghae (W)	6 ft 7 in (2.01 m)	250 lb (113 kg)	So	Robert Morgan	Miami, FL

Head coach

- Anthony Evans (St. Thomas Aquinas)

Assistant coach(es)

- Mike Gillian (Adams State)
- Spencer Wright (Oklahoma Baptist)
- Jarrett T. Lockhart (Pittsburgh)

Legend

- (C) Team captain
- (S) Suspended
- (I) Ineligible
- (W) Walk-on
- Injured
- Current redshirt

Roster

== Schedule and results ==
Date time, TV	Rank^{#}	Opponent^{#}	Result	Record	Site (attendance) city, state
Non-conference regular season
Nov 10, 2017*; 7:00 pm		Florida Memorial	W 70–47	1–0	FIU Arena (731); Miami, FL
Nov 12, 2017*; 7:00 pm		Stetson	L 64–70 ^{OT}	1–1	FIU Arena (605); Miami, FL
Nov 17, 2017*; 6:30 pm		vs. Elon; Black & Gold Shootout	L 87–95 ^{3OT}	1–2	UW–Milwaukee Panther Arena (1,686); Milwaukee, WI
Nov 18, 2017*; 6:30 pm, ESPN3		at Milwaukee; Black & Gold Shootout	L 51–66	1–3	UW–Milwaukee Panther Arena (1,313); Milwaukee, WI
Nov 19, 2017*; 2:00 pm		vs. Concordia–Saint Paul; Black & Gold Shootout	W 77–67	2–3	UW–Milwaukee Panther Arena (1,103); Milwaukee, WI
Nov 27, 2017*; 7:00 pm, CBSSN		South Carolina	L 61–78	2–4	FIU Arena (1,335); Miami, FL
Nov 29, 2017*; 7:00 pm		Florida National	W 79–61	3–4	FIU Arena (683); Miami, FL
Dec 2, 2017*; 7:00 pm		South Alabama	W 87–58	4–4	FIU Arena (653); Miami, FL
Dec 11, 2017*; 7:00 pm, ESPN3		at South Florida	W 65–53	5–4	USF Sun Dome (2,040); Tampa, FL
Dec 13, 2017*; 7:00 pm, ESPN3		at North Florida	L 85–87	5–5	UNF Arena (1,479); Jacksonville, FL
Dec 16, 2017*; 5:30 pm		James Madison	L 67–76	5–6	FIU Arena (620); Miami, FL
Dec 19, 2017*; 7:00 pm		Florida Gulf Coast	W 91–88	6–6	FIU Arena (509); Miami, FL
Dec 22, 2017*; 7:00 pm		Hartford	L 72–79	6–7	FIU Arena (497); Miami, FL
Conference USA regular season
Dec 30, 2017; 7:00 pm		Florida Atlantic	W 58–57	7–7 (1–0)	FIU Arena (589); Miami, FL
Jan 4, 2018; 7:00 pm		Middle Tennessee	L 66–71 ^{OT}	7–8 (1–1)	FIU Arena (468); Miami, FL
Jan 6, 2018; 7:00 pm		UAB	L 64–75	7–9 (1–2)	FIU Arena (515); Miami, FL
Jan 11, 2018; 8:00 pm		at UTSA	W 79–76	8–9 (2–2)	Convocation Center (1,218); San Antonio, TX
Jan 13, 2018; 9:00 pm		at UTEP	L 68–72	8–10 (2–3)	Don Haskins Center (6,074); El Paso, TX
Jan 18, 2018; 7:00 pm, ESPN3		Old Dominion	L 54–64	8–11 (2–4)	FIU Arena (1,681); Miami, FL
Jan 20, 2018; 7:00 pm		Charlotte	W 79–59	9–11 (3–4)	FIU Arena (2,195); Miami, FL
Jan 25, 2018; 8:00 pm		at Rice	L 64–73	9–12 (3–5)	Tudor Fieldhouse (1,485); Houston, TX
Jan 27, 2018; 6:00 pm		at North Texas	L 67–69 ^{OT}	9–13 (3–6)	The Super Pit (2,096); Denton, TX
Feb 1, 2018; 7:00 pm		Southern Miss	W 76–70	10–13 (4–6)	FIU Arena (1,263); Miami, FL
Feb 3, 2018; 7:00 pm		Louisiana Tech	W 71–68	11–13 (5–6)	FIU Arena (2,463); Miami, FL
Feb 8, 2018; 8:00 pm		at Marshall	L 66–76	11–14 (5–7)	Cam Henderson Center (5,078); Huntington, WV
Feb 10, 2018; 7:00 pm		at Western Kentucky	L 76–83	11–15 (5–8)	E. A. Diddle Arena (6,429); Bowling Green, KY
Feb 17, 2018; 2:00 pm		at Florida Atlantic	L 72–77	11–16 (5–9)	FAU Arena (1,198); Boca Raton, FL
Feb 22, 2018; 7:00 pm		North Texas	W 69–68	12–16 (6–9)	FIU Arena (2,163); Miami, FL
Feb 24, 2018; 7:00 pm		Rice	W 67–64	13–16 (7–9)	FIU Arena (4,580); Miami, FL
Mar 1, 2018; 7:30 pm		at Charlotte	W 89–83	14–16 (8–9)	Dale F. Halton Arena (3,305); Charlotte, NC
Mar 3, 2018; 7:00 pm		at Old Dominion	L 53–79	14–17 (8–10)	Ted Constant Convocation Center (7,879); Norfolk, VA
Conference USA tournament
Mar 7, 2018; 6:00 pm, Stadium	(8)	vs. (9) Southern Miss; First round	L 68–69	14–18	The Ford Center at The Star; Frisco, TX
*Non-conference game. ^{#}Rankings from AP Poll. (#) Tournament seedings in parentheses. All times are in Eastern Time.
