= 2017–18 Southern Miss Golden Eagles basketball team =

American college basketball season

2017–18 Southern Miss Golden Eagles basketball
- Conference: Conference USA
- Record: 16–18 (7–11 C-USA)
- Head coach: Doc Sadler (4th season)
- Assistant coaches: Steve Shields; Marques Townsend; Clarence Weatherspoon
- Home arena: Reed Green Coliseum

2017–18 Conference USA men's basketball standings
	Conf.				Overall
Team	W		L	PCT	W		L	PCT
Middle Tennessee	16	–	2	.889	25	–	8	.758
Old Dominion	15	–	3	.833	25	–	7	.781
Western Kentucky	14	–	4	.778	27	–	11	.711
Marshall †	12	–	6	.667	25	–	11	.694
UTSA	11	–	7	.611	20	–	15	.571
UAB	10	–	8	.556	20	–	13	.606
North Texas	8	–	10	.444	20	–	18	.526
FIU	8	–	10	.444	14	–	18	.438
Southern Miss	7	–	11	.389	16	–	18	.471
Louisiana Tech	7	–	11	.389	17	–	16	.515
Florida Atlantic	6	–	12	.333	12	–	19	.387
UTEP	6	–	12	.333	11	–	20	.355
Rice	4	–	14	.222	7	–	24	.226
Charlotte	2	–	16	.111	6	–	23	.207
† 2018 C-USA Tournament winner

The 2017–18 Southern Miss Golden Eagles men's basketball team represented the University of Southern Mississippi during the 2017–18 NCAA Division I men's basketball season. The Golden Eagles, led by fourth-year head coach Doc Sadler, played their home games at Reed Green Coliseum in Hattiesburg, Mississippi as members of Conference USA. They finished the season 16–18, 7–11 in C-USA play to finish in a tie for ninth place. They defeated FIU and Middle Tennessee before losing to Marshall in the semifinals of the C-USA tournament

== Previous season ==
The Golden Eagles finished the 2016–17 season 9–22, 6–12 in C-USA play to finish in 12th place. They lost in the first round of the C-USA tournament to Rice.

== Departures ==
Name	Number	Pos.	Height	Weight	Year	Hometown	Reason for departure
Raheem Watts	0	F	6'7"	216	Senior	Greenville, SC	Graduated
Robert Thomas	3	G	6'3"	185	Sophomore	Odessa, TX	Graduate transferred to Texas Wesleyan
Christian Clark	4	G	6'0"	175	RS Freshman	Hattiesburg, MS	Walk-on; left the team for personal reasons
Khari Price	5	G	5'9"	170	RS Senior	Slidell, LA	Graduated
Michael Ramey	11	G	6'5"	183	RS Senior	Indianapolis, IN	Graduated
Bilal Abdur-Rahim	13	G	6'7"	200	Sophomore	Marietta, GA	Transferred
Quinton Campbell	22	G/F	6'7"	192	RS Senior	Wilmer, AL	Graduated

=== Incoming transfers ===
Name	Number	Pos.	Height	Weight	Year	Hometown	Previous School
Leonard Harper-Baker	32	G	6'5"	205	Junior	Detroit, MI	Junior college transferred from Moberly Area CC

== Recruiting class of 2017 ==
College recruiting
Name	Hometown	School	Height	Weight	Commit date
Ladavius Draine; SG	Calhoun City, MS	Calhoun City High School	6 ft 4 in (1.93 m)	190 lb (86 kg)	Jan 10, 2017
Ladavius Draine; SG	Recruit ratings: Scout: Rivals: (NR)				
Overall recruit ranking:
Note: In many cases, Scout, Rivals, 247Sports, On3, and ESPN may conflict in their listings of height and weight.; In these cases, the average was taken. ESPN grades are on a 100-point scale.; Sources: "2017 Team Ranking". Rivals.

== Roster ==
2017–18 Southern Miss Golden Eagles men's basketball team
Players
Coaches

Pos.	#	Name	Height	Weight	Year	Previous school	Hometown
G	0	Dominic Magee	6 ft 4 in (1.93 m)	190 lb (86 kg)	RS Jr	Grand Canyon	Harvey, Louisiana
G	1	Cortez Edwards	6 ft 2 in (1.88 m)	180 lb (82 kg)	Jr	Osceola High School	Kissimmee, Florida
G	2	D'Angelo Richardson (W)	5 ft 9 in (1.75 m)	168 lb (76 kg)	Sr	Holmes Community College	Vicksburg, Mississippi
G	3	Rodney Gill (W)	6 ft 3 in (1.91 m)	193 lb (88 kg)	Jr	Northeast Community College	Theodore, Alabama
G	5	Tyree Griffin	5 ft 10 in (1.78 m)	175 lb (79 kg)	RS Jr	Oklahoma State	New Orleans, Louisiana
G	10	Josh Conley	6 ft 7 in (2.01 m)	185 lb (84 kg)	So	Sound Doctrine Christian Academy	Inglewood, California
G	11	LaDavius Draine	6 ft 4 in (1.93 m)	215 lb (98 kg)	Fr	Calhoun City High School	Calhoun City, Mississippi
F	12	Tim Rowe	6 ft 11 in (2.11 m)	220 lb (100 kg)	Jr	Mt. Zion Prep	Lilburn, Georgia
F	15	Eddie Davis III (W)	6 ft 7 in (2.01 m)	248 lb (112 kg)	RS Jr	Centennial High School	Las Vegas, Nevada
G	20	Kevin Holland	6 ft 1 in (1.85 m)	187 lb (85 kg)	RS Jr	Paul W. Bryant High School	Tuscaloosa, Alabama
G	21	Anfernee Hampton (W)	6 ft 5 in (1.96 m)	170 lb (77 kg)	RS Jr	Mississippi Gulf Coast Community College	Jackson, Mississippi
G	30	Clay Weatherspoon (W)	6 ft 2 in (1.88 m)	195 lb (88 kg)	So	Ridgeland High School (MS)	Jackson, Mississippi
F	32	Leonard Harper-Baker	6 ft 5 in (1.96 m)	205 lb (93 kg)	Jr	Moberly Area Community College	Detroit, Michigan

Head coach

- Doc Sadler (Auburn)

Assistant coach(es)

- Steve Shields (Baylor)
- Marques Townsend (Kansas)
- Clarence Weatherspoon (Southern Miss)

Legend

- (C) Team captain
- (S) Suspended
- (I) Ineligible
- (W) Walk-on
- Injured
- Current redshirt

Roster

== Schedule and results ==
Date time, TV	Rank^{#}	Opponent^{#}	Result	Record	Site (attendance) city, state
Non-conference regular season
Nov 10, 2017*; 7:00 pm		Southern (New Orleans)	W 79–69	1–0	Reed Green Coliseum (2,118); Hattiesburg, MS
Nov 16, 2017*; 6:00 pm, BTN+		at Michigan	L 47–61	1–1	Crisler Arena (8,765); Ann Arbor, MI
Nov 20, 2017*; 7:00 pm		Blue Mountain; Sanford Pentagon Showcase	W 90–46	2–1	Reed Green Coliseum (1,848); Hattiesburg, MS
Nov 24, 2017*; 5:30 pm		vs. South Dakota; Sanford Pentagon Showcase	L 71–84	2–2	Sanford Pentagon (1,105); Sioux Falls, SD
Nov 25, 2017*; 4:00 pm		vs. Youngstown State; Sanford Pentagon Showcase	W 71–64	3–2	Sanford Pentagon (343); Sioux Falls, SD
Nov 26, 2017*; 11:30 am		vs. Northern Colorado; Sanford Pentagon Showcase	L 63–77	3–3	Sanford Pentagon (101); Sioux Falls, SD
Nov 29, 2017*; 7:00 pm		at South Alabama	L 58–69	3–4	Mitchell Center (2,353); Mobile, AL
Dec 3, 2017*; 2:00 pm		Rust	W 109–61	4–4	Reed Green Coliseum (1,792); Hattiesburg, MS
Dec 10, 2017*; 2:00 pm		Troy	W 89–71	5–4	Reed Green Coliseum (1,937); Hattiesburg, MS
Dec 13, 2017*; 6:00 pm		at Alabama A&M	W 69–54	6–4	Elmore Gymnasium (382); Huntsville, AL
Dec 16, 2017*; 4:00 pm		William Carey	W 75–58	7–4	Reed Green Coliseum (1,914); Hattiesburg, MS
Dec 21, 2017*; 1:00 pm, ACCN Extra		at No. 24 Florida State	L 45–98	7–5	Donald L. Tucker Civic Center (5,003); Tallahassee, FL
Dec 23, 2017*; 6:00 pm		vs. Mississippi State; Jackson Showcase	L 64–70	7–6	Mississippi Coliseum (4,028); Jackson, MS
Conference USA regular season
Dec 28, 2017; 6:00 pm		at Marshall	L 66–85	7–7 (0–1)	Cam Henderson Center (5,537); Huntington, WV
Dec 30, 2017; 2:00 pm		at Western Kentucky	L 66–82	7–8 (0–2)	E. A. Diddle Arena (4,654); Bowling Green, KY
Jan 4, 2018; 7:00 pm, beIN		UTEP	W 85–75	8–8 (1–2)	Reed Green Coliseum (1,956); Hattiesburg, MS
Jan 6, 2018; 4:00 pm		UTSA	W 93–83	9–8 (2–2)	Reed Green Coliseum (1,834); Hattiesburg, MS
Jan 11, 2018; 7:00 pm		at UAB	L 75–86	9–9 (2–3)	Bartow Arena (3,351); Birmingham, AL
Jan 13, 2018; 5:00 pm, ESPN3		at Middle Tennessee	L 49–69	9–10 (2–4)	Murphy Center (4,871); Murfreesboro, TN
Jan 18, 2018; 7:00 pm		Rice	W 86–75	10–10 (3–4)	Reed Green Coliseum (2,001); Hattiesburg, MS
Jan 20, 2018; 4:00 pm		North Texas	W 85–78	11–10 (4–4)	Reed Green Coliseum (2,540); Hattiesburg, MS
Jan 27, 2018; 6:00 pm		at Louisiana Tech	L 66–89	11–11 (4–5)	Thomas Assembly Center (4,269); Ruston, LA
Feb 1, 2018; 6:00 pm		at FIU	L 70–76	11–12 (4–6)	FIU Arena (1,263); Miami, FL
Feb 3, 2018; 6:00 pm		at Florida Atlantic	W 77–66	12–12 (5–6)	FAU Arena (1,559); Boca Raton, FL
Feb 8, 2018; 7:00 pm		Old Dominion	L 63–68	12–13 (5–7)	Reed Green Coliseum (1,984); Hattiesburg, MS
Feb 10, 2018; 4:30 pm		Charlotte	W 72–54	13–13 (6–7)	Reed Green Coliseum (2,880); Hattiesburg, MS
Feb 15, 2018; 7:00 pm		Middle Tennessee	L 62–72	13–14 (6–8)	Reed Green Coliseum (2,062); Hattiesburg, MS
Feb 17, 2018; 4:00 pm		UAB	L 69–87	13–15 (6–9)	Reed Green Coliseum (2,405); Hattiesburg, MS
Feb 22, 2018; 7:00 pm		at UTSA	L 56–64	13–16 (6–10)	Convocation Center (1,082); San Antonio, TX
Feb 24, 2018; 8:00 pm		at UTEP	L 44–73	13–17 (6–11)	Don Haskins Center (6,117); El Paso, TX
Mar 3, 2018; 4:30 pm		Louisiana Tech	W 72–64	14–17 (7–11)	Reed Green Coliseum (2,687); Hattiesburg, MS
Conference USA tournament
Mar 7, 2018; 6:00 pm, Stadium	(9)	vs. (8) FIU; First round	W 69–68	15–17	The Ford Center at The Star; Frisco, TX
Mar 8, 2018; 6:00 pm, Stadium	(9)	vs. (1) Middle Tennessee; Quarterfinals	W 71–68 ^{OT}	16–17	The Ford Center at The Star; Frisco, TX
Mar 9, 2018; 12:30 pm, CBSSN	(9)	vs. (4) Marshall; Semifinals	L 75–85	16–18	The Ford Center at The Star; Frisco, TX
*Non-conference game. ^{#}Rankings from AP Poll. (#) Tournament seedings in parentheses. All times are in Central Time Source.
