= 2017–18 Charlotte 49ers men's basketball team =

American college basketball season

2017–18 Charlotte 49ers men's basketball
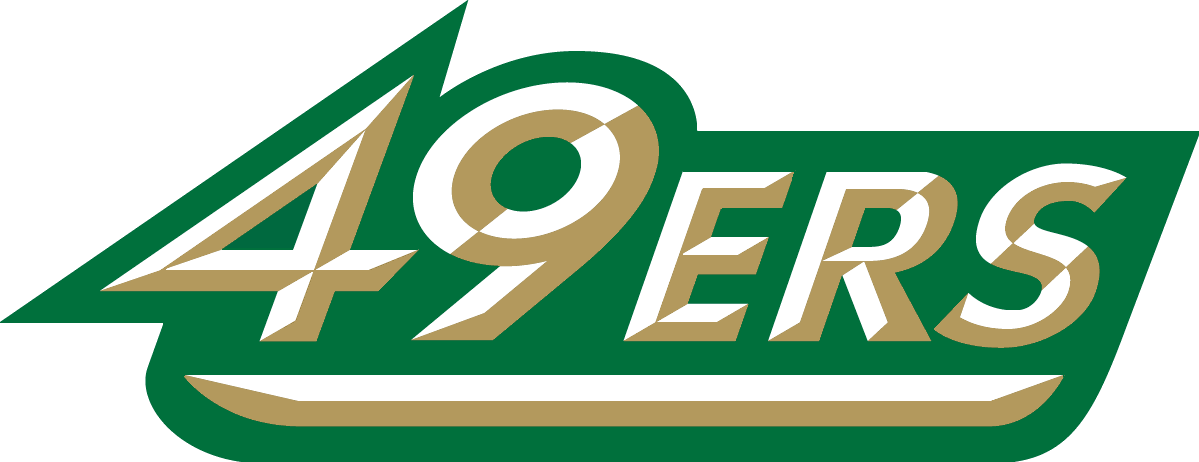
- Conference: Conference USA
- Record: 6–23 (2–16 C-USA)
- Head coach: Mark Price (First 9 games); Houston Fancher (interim)
- Assistant coaches: Andre Gray; Ivo Simovic
- Home arena: Dale F. Halton Arena

2017–18 Conference USA men's basketball standings
	Conf.				Overall
Team	W		L	PCT	W		L	PCT
Middle Tennessee	16	–	2	.889	25	–	8	.758
Old Dominion	15	–	3	.833	25	–	7	.781
Western Kentucky	14	–	4	.778	27	–	11	.711
Marshall †	12	–	6	.667	25	–	11	.694
UTSA	11	–	7	.611	20	–	15	.571
UAB	10	–	8	.556	20	–	13	.606
North Texas	8	–	10	.444	20	–	18	.526
FIU	8	–	10	.444	14	–	18	.438
Southern Miss	7	–	11	.389	16	–	18	.471
Louisiana Tech	7	–	11	.389	17	–	16	.515
Florida Atlantic	6	–	12	.333	12	–	19	.387
UTEP	6	–	12	.333	11	–	20	.355
Rice	4	–	14	.222	7	–	24	.226
Charlotte	2	–	16	.111	6	–	23	.207
† 2018 C-USA Tournament winner

The 2017–18 Charlotte 49ers men's basketball team represented the University of North Carolina at Charlotte during the 2017–18 NCAA Division I men's basketball season. The 49ers, led by interim head coach Houston Fancher, played their home games at the Dale F. Halton Arena as members Conference USA. They finished the season 6–23, 2–16 in C-USA play to finish in last place. They failed to qualify for the C-USA tournament.

On December 14, 2017, head coach Mark Price was fired after a 3–6 start to the season and was replaced by Fancher. Houston Fancher was named interim coach for the remainder of the season. On March 6, 2018, new athletic director Mike Hill fired Fancher. On March 19, the school hired Virginia associate head coach Ron Sanchez as their new head coach.

== Previous season ==
The 49ers finished the 2016–17 season 13–17, 7–11 in C-USA play to finish in 10th place. They lost to UAB in the first round of the C-USA tournament.

== Offseason ==
=== Departures ===
Name	Number	Pos.	Height	Weight	Year	Hometown	Reason for departure
Braxton Ogbueze	1	G	6'1"	185	RS Senior	Charlotte, NC	Graduated
Quentin Jackson	11	G	6'3"	184	Freshman	Cary, NC	Transferred to Tallahassee CC
Lukas Bergang	12	F/C	7'1"	215	RS Freshman	Gothenburg, Sweden	Transferred to Tyler JC
JC Washington	14	F	6'7"	240	Junior	Houston, TX	Transferred to William Penn
Anthony Vanhook	15	F	6'4"	225	Senior	Chapel Hill, NC	Graduated
Reid Aube	25	F	6'7"	223	Senior	Concord, NC	Graduated
Luke Sasser	30	F	6'5"	240	Junior	Raleigh, NC	Transferred to George Washington
Benas Griciunas	31	C	7'0"	244	Junior	Šilutė, Lithuania	Graduate transferred to Eastern Washington

=== Incoming transfers ===
Name	Number	Pos.	Height	Weight	Year	Hometown	Previous
Jailan Haslem	0	C	6'10"	260	Junior	Warner Robins, GA	Transferred from Gordon State College. Will be eligible immediately.

=== 2017 recruiting class ===
College recruiting
Name	Hometown	School	Height	Weight	Commit date
Jaylan McGill; G	Charlotte, NC	Olympic High School	6 ft 2 in (1.88 m)	165 lb (75 kg)	Jun 14, 2017
Jaylan McGill; G	Recruit ratings: No ratings found				
Luka Vasic; G	Pirot, Serbia	Avon Old Farms School	6 ft 7 in (2.01 m)	187 lb (85 kg)	Jun 9, 2017
Luka Vasic; G	Recruit ratings: Scout: Rivals:				
Bryant Thomas; F	Charlotte, NC	South Mecklenburg High School	6 ft 8 in (2.03 m)	180 lb (82 kg)	Apr 25, 2017
Bryant Thomas; F	Recruit ratings: Scout: Rivals: (NR)				
Milos Supica; F	Belgrade, Serbia	Freedom Christian Academy	6 ft 8 in (2.03 m)	235 lb (107 kg)	Apr 24, 2017
Milos Supica; F	Recruit ratings: Scout: Rivals: (NR)				
Overall recruit ranking:
Note: In many cases, Scout, Rivals, 247Sports, On3, and ESPN may conflict in their listings of height and weight.; In these cases, the average was taken. ESPN grades are on a 100-point scale.; Sources: "2016 Team Ranking". Rivals.

== Roster ==
2017–18 Charlotte 49ers men's basketball team
Players
Coaches

Pos.	#	Name	Height	Weight	Year	Previous school	Hometown
C	0	Jailan Haslem	6 ft 10 in (2.08 m)	260 lb (118 kg)	Jr	Gordon State College	Warner Robins, Georgia
F	1	Najee Garvin	6 ft 7 in (2.01 m)	220 lb (100 kg)	So	Moravian Prep Academy	Lexington, South Carolina
G	2	Andrien White	6 ft 3 in (1.91 m)	195 lb (88 kg)	Jr	Quality Education Academy	Richmond, Virginia
G	3	Jon Davis	6 ft 3 in (1.91 m)	200 lb (91 kg)	Jr	Hargrave Military Academy	Upper Marlboro, Maryland
G	5	Austin Ajukwa	6 ft 7 in (2.01 m)	210 lb (95 kg)	RS Sr	Clemson	Columbia, South Carolina
G	10	Corey Bias	6 ft 1 in (1.85 m)	190 lb (86 kg)	Sr	Rufus King High School	Milwaukee, Wisconsin
F	11	Bo Blight (W)	6 ft 7 in (2.01 m)	205 lb (93 kg)	RS Fr	South Mecklenburg High School	Charlotte, North Carolina
G	12	Jaylen McGill	6 ft 2 in (1.88 m)	200 lb (91 kg)	Fr	Olympic Community of Schools	Charlotte, North Carolina
F	15	Milos Supica	6 ft 9 in (2.06 m)	235 lb (107 kg)	Fr	Freedom Christian Academy	Belgrade, Serbia
G	24	Ryan Murphy	6 ft 2 in (1.88 m)	190 lb (86 kg)	RS Fr	Calabasas High School	Calabasas, California
F	30	Bryant Thomas	6 ft 9 in (2.06 m)	205 lb (93 kg)	Fr	South Mecklenburg High School	Charlotte, North Carolina
G	35	Luka Vasic	6 ft 8 in (2.03 m)	200 lb (91 kg)	Fr	Avon Old Farms (Conn.)	Pirot, Serbia

Head coach

- Houston Fancher (Middle Tennessee)

Assistant coach(es)

- Andre Gray (Methodist)
- Ivo Simović (Union (Serbia))

Legend

- (C) Team captain
- (S) Suspended
- (I) Ineligible
- (W) Walk-on
- Injured
- Current redshirt

Roster

== Schedule and results ==
Date time, TV	Opponent	Result	Record	Site (attendance) city, state
Non-conference regular season
Nov 10, 2017*; 7:30 pm	Methodist	W 116–76	1–0	Dale F. Halton Arena (4,841); Charlotte, NC
Nov 13, 2017*; 8:00 pm, FSOK+	at Oklahoma State	L 65–83	1–1	Gallagher-Iba Arena (4,387); Stillwater, OK
Nov 18, 2017*; 7:00 pm	College of Charleston	L 72–81	1–2	Dale F. Halton Arena (4,122); Charlotte, NC
Nov 20, 2017*; 7:00 pm	Presbyterian	W 83–74	2–2	Dale F. Halton Arena (3,260); Charlotte, NC
Nov 24, 2017*; 7:00 pm	High Point	W 70–67	3–2	Dale F. Halton Arena (3,256); Charlotte, NC
Nov 28, 2017*; 7:00 pm, STADIUM	Davidson	L 70–85	3–3	Dale F. Halton Arena (4,418); Charlotte, NC
Dec 2, 2017*; 8:00 pm	at James Madison	L 82–87	3–4	JMU Convocation Center (2,439); Harrisonburg, VA
Dec 5, 2017*; 7:00 pm, STADIUM	Wake Forest	L 50–87	3–5	Dale F. Halton Arena (5,512); Charlotte, NC
Dec 10, 2017*; 1:00 pm	at Chattanooga	L 50–64	3–6	McKenzie Arena (3,676); Chattanooga, TN
Dec 18, 2017*; 7:00 pm, ESPN3	at East Carolina	W 69–50	4–6	Williams Arena (3,162); Greenville, NC
Dec 21, 2017*; 7:00 pm, ESPN3	at South Florida	L 76–78	4–7	USF Sun Dome (2,099); Tampa, FL
Conference USA regular season
Dec 30, 2017; 7:00 pm	at Old Dominion	L 58–89	4–8 (0–1)	Ted Constant Convocation Center (5,660); Norfolk, VA
Jan 4, 2018; 8:00 pm	at North Texas	W 70–68	5–8 (1–1)	The Super Pit (1,826); Denton, TX
Jan 6, 2018; 3:00 pm	at Rice	L 64–73	5–9 (1–2)	Tudor Fieldhouse (1,482); Houston, TX
Jan 11, 2018; 7:00 pm, ESPN3	Marshall	L 83–91	5–10 (1–3)	Dale F. Halton Arena (4,640); Charlotte, NC
Jan 13, 2018; 7:00 pm	Western Kentucky	L 63–73	5–11 (1–4)	Dale F. Halton Arena (3,845); Charlotte, NC
Jan 18, 2018; 7:00 pm	at Florida Atlantic	L 64–75	5–12 (1–5)	FAU Arena (1,307); Boca Raton, FL
Jan 20, 2018; 7:00 pm	at FIU	L 59–79	5–13 (1–6)	FIU Arena (2,195); Miami, FL
Jan 27, 2018; 7:00 pm	Old Dominion	L 66–88	5–14 (1–7)	Dale F. Halton Arena (4,592); Charlotte, NC
Feb 1, 2018; 7:00 pm	UAB	L 64–76	5–15 (1–8)	Dale F. Halton Arena (3,266); Charlotte, NC
Feb 3, 2018; 7:00 pm	Middle Tennessee	L 73–78	5–16 (1–9)	Dale F. Halton Arena (4,078); Charlotte, NC
Feb 8, 2018; 8:00 pm, beIN	at Louisiana Tech	L 65–83	5–17 (1–10)	Thomas Assembly Center (3,657); Ruston, LA
Feb 10, 2018; 5:00 pm	at Southern Miss	L 54–72	5–18 (1–11)	Reed Green Coliseum (2,880); Hattiesburg, MS
Feb 15, 2018; 7:00 pm	UTEP	L 86–87	5–19 (1–12)	Dale F. Halton Arena (3,059); Charlotte, NC
Feb 17, 2018; 7:00 pm	UTSA	L 89–97 ^{OT}	5–20 (1–13)	Dale F. Halton Arena (3,939); Charlotte, NC
Feb 22, 2018; 8:00 pm, beIN	at Western Kentucky	L 55–93	5–21 (1–14)	E.A. Diddle Arena (5,634); Bowling Green, KY
Feb 24, 2018; 7:00 pm	at Marshall	L 75–103	5–22 (1–15)	Cam Henderson Center (6,575); Huntington, WV
Mar 1, 2018; 7:30 pm	FIU	L 83–89	5–23 (1–16)	Dale F. Halton Arena (3,305); Charlotte, NC
Mar 3, 2018; 7:30 pm	Florida Atlantic	W 85–78	6–23 (2–16)	Dale F. Halton Arena (4,857); Charlotte, NC
*Non-conference game. ^{#}Rankings from AP Poll/Coaches' Poll. (#) Tournament seedings in parentheses. All times are in Eastern Time. Source
