= 2017–18 UAB Blazers men's basketball team =

American college basketball season

2017–18 UAB Blazers men's basketball
- Conference: Conference USA
- Record: 20–13 (10–8 C-USA)
- Head coach: Robert Ehsan (2nd season)
- Assistant coaches: Turner Battle; Dannton Jackson; Kevin Devitt
- Home arena: Bartow Arena

2017–18 Conference USA men's basketball standings
	Conf.				Overall
Team	W		L	PCT	W		L	PCT
Middle Tennessee	16	–	2	.889	25	–	8	.758
Old Dominion	15	–	3	.833	25	–	7	.781
Western Kentucky	14	–	4	.778	27	–	11	.711
Marshall †	12	–	6	.667	25	–	11	.694
UTSA	11	–	7	.611	20	–	15	.571
UAB	10	–	8	.556	20	–	13	.606
North Texas	8	–	10	.444	20	–	18	.526
FIU	8	–	10	.444	14	–	18	.438
Southern Miss	7	–	11	.389	16	–	18	.471
Louisiana Tech	7	–	11	.389	17	–	16	.515
Florida Atlantic	6	–	12	.333	12	–	19	.387
UTEP	6	–	12	.333	11	–	20	.355
Rice	4	–	14	.222	7	–	24	.226
Charlotte	2	–	16	.111	6	–	23	.207
† 2018 C-USA Tournament winner

The 2017–18 UAB Blazers basketball team represented the University of Alabama at Birmingham during the 2017–18 NCAA Division I men's basketball season. The Blazers, led by second-year head coach Robert Ehsan, played their home games at the Bartow Arena as members of Conference USA. They finished the season 20–13, 10–8 C-USA play to finish in sixth place. The defeated Florida Atlantic in the first round of the C-USA tournament before losing to Western Kentucky. Despite winning 20 games, they did not participate in a postseason tournament.

== Previous season ==
The Blazers finished the 2016–17 season 17–16, 9–9 in C-USA play to finish in a tie for seventh place. They defeated Charlotte in the first round of the C-USA tournament before losing to Louisiana Tech.

== Offseason ==
=== Departures ===
Name	Number	Pos.	Height	Weight	Year	Hometown	Previous School
Hakeem Baxter	0	G	6'2"	186	Senior	Philadelphia, PA	Graduated
Denzell Watts	1	G	6'2"	235	Senior	Flint, MI	Graduated
Javien Williams	10	G	6'4"	175	Freshman	Birmingham, AL	Transferred to Tallahassee CC
Dirk Williams	11	G	6'5"	178	Senior	Homewood, AL	Graduated
Tosin Mehinti	21	F	6'9"	244	Senior	Lagos, Nigeria	Graduated
Tyler Madison	22	G	6'4"	222	Senior	Columbiana, AL	Graduated

=== Incoming transfers ===
Name	Number	Pos.	Height	Weight	Year	Hometown	Previous School
Jalen Perry	21	G	6'3"	180	Junior	Louisville, KY	Junior college transferred from John A. Logan College.

=== Incoming recruits ===
College recruiting
Name	Hometown	School	Height	Weight	Commit date
Makhtar Gueye #64 PF	Lake Forest, IL	ASPIRE Basketball Academy	6 ft 10 in (2.08 m)	N/A	Oct 24, 2016
Makhtar Gueye #64 PF	Recruit ratings: Scout: Rivals: (75)				
Luis Hurtado #83 SG	Weston, FL	The Sagemont School	6 ft 5 in (1.96 m)	175 lb (79 kg)	Nov 17, 2016
Luis Hurtado #83 SG	Recruit ratings: Scout: Rivals: (68)				
Zack Bryant; PG	Jacksonville, FL	Providence School of Jacksonville	6 ft 1 in (1.85 m)	175 lb (79 kg)	Aug 9, 2016
Zack Bryant; PG	Recruit ratings: Scout: Rivals: (NR)				
Overall recruit ranking:
Note: In many cases, Scout, Rivals, 247Sports, On3, and ESPN may conflict in their listings of height and weight.; In these cases, the average was taken. ESPN grades are on a 100-point scale.; Sources: "2017 Team Ranking". Rivals.

=== Recruiting class of 2018 ===
College recruiting (2018)
Name	Hometown	School	Height	Weight	Commit date
Tamel Pearson #31 C	Chicago, IL	Morgan Park High School	6 ft 8 in (2.03 m)	N/A	Sep 4, 2017
Tamel Pearson #31 C	Recruit ratings: Scout: Rivals: (79)				
Ryan Boyce; SF	Memphis, TN	East High School	6 ft 5 in (1.96 m)	180 lb (82 kg)	Oct 13, 2017
Ryan Boyce; SF	Recruit ratings: Scout: Rivals: (NR)				
Jude Akabueze; C	Lagos, Nigeria	North Marion High School	6 ft 8 in (2.03 m)	208 lb (94 kg)	Nov 19, 2017
Jude Akabueze; C	Recruit ratings: Scout: Rivals: (NR)				
Overall recruit ranking:
Note: In many cases, Scout, Rivals, 247Sports, On3, and ESPN may conflict in their listings of height and weight.; In these cases, the average was taken. ESPN grades are on a 100-point scale.; Sources: "2018 Team Ranking". Rivals.

== Roster ==
2017–18 UAB Blazers men's basketball team
Players
Coaches

Pos.	#	Name	Height	Weight	Year	Previous school	Hometown
G	1	Zack Bryant	6 ft 2 in (1.88 m)	180 lb (82 kg)	Fr	Providence School	Hastings, Florida
G	2	Nick Norton	5 ft 10 in (1.78 m)	166 lb (75 kg)	Sr	Central Catholic High School	Bloomington, Illinois
F	3	Chris Cokley	6 ft 8 in (2.03 m)	238 lb (108 kg)	Sr	Savannah High School	Savannah, Georgia
G	4	Anderson McCoy (W)	5 ft 11 in (1.8 m)	166 lb (75 kg)	Jr	Ancilla College	Indianapolis, Indiana
G	5	Deion Lavender	6 ft 4 in (1.93 m)	190 lb (86 kg)	RS Jr	Southern Illinois	Alton, Illinois
G	10	Luis Hurtado	6 ft 6 in (1.98 m)	213 lb (97 kg)	Fr	The Sagemont School	Mérida, Venezuela
F	11	Makhtar Gueye	6 ft 10 in (2.08 m)	185 lb (84 kg)	Fr	Aspire Academy	Rufisque, Senegal
G	12	Hunter Reynolds (W)	6 ft 0 in (1.83 m)	161 lb (73 kg)	Fr	Christian Academy of Knoxville	Knoxville, TN
G	13	Nate Darling	6 ft 5 in (1.96 m)	190 lb (86 kg)	So	DeMatha Catholic High School	Halifax, Nova Scotia
G	21	Jalen Perry	6 ft 3 in (1.91 m)	195 lb (88 kg)	Jr	John A. Logan College	Louisville, Kentucky
F	23	Lewis Sullivan	6 ft 7 in (2.01 m)	223 lb (101 kg)	RS Jr	Hazel Green High School	Hazel Green, Alabama
F	33	Thomas Smallwood	7 ft 0 in (2.13 m)	243 lb (110 kg)	Jr	Lycée Général Saint John Perse	Bordeaux, France
F	34	William Lee	6 ft 9 in (2.06 m)	206 lb (93 kg)	Sr	Dallas County High School	Plantersville, Alabama

Head coach

- Robert Ehsan (UC Davis)

Assistant coach(es)

- Turner Battle (Buffalo)
- Dannton Jackson (Xavier (LA))
- Kevin Devitt (DePaul)

Legend

- (C) Team captain
- (S) Suspended
- (I) Ineligible
- (W) Walk-on
- Injured
- Current redshirt

Roster

== Schedule and results ==
Date time, TV	Rank^{#}	Opponent^{#}	Result	Record	Site (attendance) city, state
Exhibition
November 2, 2017*; 7:00 pm		Morehouse	W 84–69		Bartow Arena (3,203); Birmingham, AL
Non-conference regular season
November 10*; 7:00 pm		Jacksonville	W 96–67	1–0	Bartow Arena (3,106); Birmingham, AL
November 13*; 7:00 pm		Chattanooga; Cayman Islands Classic campus site game	W 89–47	2–0	Bartow Arena (2,985); Birmingham, AL
November 16*; 7:00 pm		LeMoyne–Owen	W 81–57	3–0	Bartow Arena (2,828); Birmingham, AL
November 20*; 4:00 pm		vs. Richmond; Cayman Islands Classic quarterfinals	L 50–63	3–1	John Gray Gymnasium (650); George Town, Cayman Islands
November 21*; 4:00 pm		vs. Buffalo; Cayman Islands Classic consolation round	L 91–96 ^{OT}	3–2	John Gray Gymnasium (404); George Town, Cayman Islands
November 22*; 11:00 am		vs. Iowa; Cayman Islands Classic 7th place game	L 85–95	3–3	John Gray Gymnasium (1,020); George Town, Cayman Islands
November 26*; 3:00 pm		Mississippi College	W 90–53	4–3	Bartow Arena (3,222); Birmingham, AL
November 30*; 7:00 pm, Stadium		Memphis; Bartow Classic	W 71–56	5–3	Bartow Arena (4,920); Birmingham, AL
December 5*; 7:00 pm, ESPN3		at Troy	W 90–78	6–3	Trojan Arena (3,213); Troy, AL
December 9*; 3:30 pm, SECN		at Auburn; Rivalry	L 80–85	6–4	Auburn Arena (7,965); Auburn, AL
December 16*; 2:15 pm		vs. Alabama A&M; BHM JAM	W 90–58	7–4	Legacy Arena (7,209); Birmingham, AL
December 20*; 7:00 pm		New Orleans	W 74–67	8–4	Bartow Arena (3,229); Birmingham, AL
December 23*; 2:00 pm		Mississippi Valley State	W 74–57	9–4	Bartow Arena (2,783); Birmingham, AL
Conference USA regular season
December 30; 4:00 pm, Stadium		Middle Tennessee	L 60–63	9–5 (0–1)	Bartow Arena (4,143); Birmingham, AL
January 4, 2018; 6:00 pm		at Florida Atlantic	W 75–44	10–5 (1–1)	FAU Arena (1,091); Boca Raton, FL
January 6; 6:00 pm		at FIU	W 75–64	11–5 (2–1)	FIU Arena (515); Miami, FL
January 11; 7:00 pm		Southern Miss	W 86–75	12–5 (3–1)	Bartow Arena (3,351); Birmingham, AL
January 13; 4:00 pm, Stadium		Louisiana Tech	W 74–62	13–5 (4–1)	Bartow Arena (3,743); Birmingham, AL
January 18; 8:00 pm, CBSSN		at WKU	L 69–77	13–6 (4–2)	E. A. Diddle Arena (5,643); Bowling Green, KY
January 20; 6:00 pm		at Marshall	L 78–86 ^{OT}	13–7 (4–3)	Cam Henderson Center (6,740); Huntington, WV
January 25; 7:00 pm, beIN		UTEP	W 85–78	14–7 (5–3)	Bartow Arena (3,013); Birmingham, AL
January 27; 7:00 pm, ESPN3		UTSA	L 70–82	14–8 (5–4)	Bartow Arena (4,259); Birmingham, AL
February 1; 6:00 pm		at Charlotte	W 76–64	15–8 (6–4)	Halton Arena (3,266); Charlotte, NC
February 3; 6:00 pm		at Old Dominion	L 60–65	15–9 (6–5)	Ted Constant Convocation Center (6,481); Norfolk, VA
February 8; 7:00 pm		North Texas	L 60–67	15–10 (6–6)	Bartow Arena (3,383); Birmingham, AL
February 10; 7:00 pm		Rice	W 61–56	16–10 (7–6)	Bartow Arena (3,703); Birmingham, AL
February 15; 8:00 pm, CBSSN		at Louisiana Tech	L 60–73	16–11 (7–7)	Thomas Assembly Center (3,562); Ruston, LA
February 17; 4:00 pm		at Southern Miss	W 87–69	17–11 (8–7)	Reed Green Coliseum (2,405); Hattiesburg, MS
February 24; 6:00 pm, Stadium		at No. 24 Middle Tennessee	L 54–79	17–12 (8–8)	Murphy Center (9,717); Murfreesboro, TN
March 1; 7:00 pm, beIN		Marshall	W 91–77	18–12 (9–8)	Bartow Arena (3,156); Birmingham, AL
March 4; 7:00 pm		WKU	W 101–73	19–12 (10–8)	Bartow Arena (4,363); Birmingham, AL
Conference USA tournament
March 7; 9:00 pm, Stadium	(6)	vs. (11) Florida Atlantic; First round	W 83–72	20–12	The Ford Center at The Star (5,198); Frisco, TX
March 7; 9:00 pm, Stadium	(6)	vs. (3) WKU; Quarterfinals	L 70–98	20–13	The Ford Center at The Star (2,531); Frisco, TX
*Non-conference game. (#) Tournament seedings in parentheses. All times are in Central Time.
