= Beach ball (disambiguation) =

A beach ball is an inflatable ball for beach and water games.

Beach ball, Beach Ball or Beachball may also refer to:

- Beach Ball, a 1965 film
- "Beachball" (song), by Nalin & Kane
- Spinning pinwheel – animated progress indicator used in Apple macOS
- Beach Ball, a character from the sixth season of Battle for Dream Island, an animated web series

== See also ==
- Beachball plot, colloquial name for the graphical representation of moment tensor solutions of earthquakes, see Focal mechanism
- Beach Ball Classic, a basketball competition
