= 2017–18 Marshall Thundering Herd men's basketball team =

American college basketball season

2017–18 Marshall Thundering Herd men's basketball

C-USA tournament champions

NCAA tournament, Second Round
- Conference: Conference USA
- Record: 25–11 (12–6 C-USA)
- Head coach: Dan D'Antoni (4th season)
- Assistant coaches: Mark Cline; Scott Rigot; Cornelius Jackson
- Home arena: Cam Henderson Center

2017–18 Conference USA men's basketball standings
	Conf.				Overall
Team	W		L	PCT	W		L	PCT
Middle Tennessee	16	–	2	.889	25	–	8	.758
Old Dominion	15	–	3	.833	25	–	7	.781
Western Kentucky	14	–	4	.778	27	–	11	.711
Marshall †	12	–	6	.667	25	–	11	.694
UTSA	11	–	7	.611	20	–	15	.571
UAB	10	–	8	.556	20	–	13	.606
North Texas	8	–	10	.444	20	–	18	.526
FIU	8	–	10	.444	14	–	18	.438
Southern Miss	7	–	11	.389	16	–	18	.471
Louisiana Tech	7	–	11	.389	17	–	16	.515
Florida Atlantic	6	–	12	.333	12	–	19	.387
UTEP	6	–	12	.333	11	–	20	.355
Rice	4	–	14	.222	7	–	24	.226
Charlotte	2	–	16	.111	6	–	23	.207
† 2018 C-USA Tournament winner

The 2017–18 Marshall Thundering Herd men's basketball team represented the Marshall University during the 2017–18 NCAA Division I men's basketball season. The Thundering Herd, led by fourth-year head coach Dan D'Antoni, played their home games at the Cam Henderson Center as members of Conference USA. They finished the season 25–11, 12–6 in C-USA play to finish in fourth place. They defeated UTSA, Southern Miss, and Western Kentucky to become champions of the C-USA tournament. They received C-USA's automatic bid to the NCAA tournament where, as a No. 13 seed, they upset Wichita State in the first round before losing to West Virginia in the second round.

== Previous season ==
The Thundering Herd finished the 2016–17 season 20–15, 10–8 in C-USA play to finish in sixth place. They defeated Florida Atlantic, Old Dominion, and Louisiana Tech to advance to the championship game of the C-USA tournament. There they lost to top-seeded Middle Tennessee. Despite finishing with 20 wins, they did not participate in a postseason tournament.

== Offseason ==
=== Departures ===
Name	Number	Pos.	Height	Weight	Year	Hometown	Notes
Ky're Allison	5	G	6'2"	181	Freshman	Portsmouth, Ohio	Transferred to Sinclair Community College
Stevie Browning	2	G	6'3"	188	RS Senior	Logan, West Virginia	Graduated
Jacob Kilgore	4	F	6'5"	191	Sophomore	Huntington, West Virginia	Walk-on; did not return
Austin Loop	35	G	6'4"	210	RS Senior	South Webster, Ohio	Graduated
Aleksa Nikolić	21	G	6'6.5"	221	RS Sophomore	Pančevo, Serbia	Graduated; did not return
Ryan Taylor	25	F	6'5"	249	RS Senior	Indianapolis, Indiana	Graduated
Terrence Thompson	1	F	6'7"	217	Junior	Durham, North Carolina	Graduate transferred to Wake Forest

=== Incoming transfers ===
Name	Number	Pos.	Height	Weight	Year	Hometown	Previous School
Dani Koljanin	1	F	6'8"	219	Junior	Pula, Croatia	Junior college transferred from Monroe College

=== 2017 recruiting class ===
College recruiting information
Name	Hometown	School	Height	Weight	Commit date
Jarrod West; PG	Clarksburg, West Virginia	Notre Dame High School	5 ft 11 in (1.80 m)	179 lb (81 kg)	Sep 15, 2016
Jarrod West; PG	Recruit ratings: Scout: Rivals: (NR)				
Darius George; SF	Staunton, Virginia	Robert E. Lee High School	6 ft 7 in (2.01 m)	190 lb (86 kg)	Sep 19, 2016
Darius George; SF	Recruit ratings: Scout: Rivals: (NR)				
Tanner Robinette; PF	Honaker, Virginia	Hargrave Military Academy	6 ft 7 in (2.01 m)	235 lb (107 kg)	Sep 26, 2016
Tanner Robinette; PF	Recruit ratings: Scout: Rivals: ESPN:				
Iran Bennett; C	North Carolina	Hargrave Military Academy	6 ft 9 in (2.06 m)	290 lb (130 kg)	Oct 17, 2016
Iran Bennett; C	Recruit ratings: Scout: Rivals: 247Sports: ESPN:				
Overall recruit ranking: Scout: NR Rivals: NR ESPN: NR
Note: In many cases, Scout, Rivals, 247Sports, On3, and ESPN may conflict in their listings of height and weight.; In these cases, the average was taken. ESPN grades are on a 100-point scale.; Sources: "Marshall Basketball Commitment List". Rivals.; "2017 Marshall Basketball Commits". Scout.; "ESPN". ESPN.; "Scout.com Team Recruiting Rankings". Scout.; "2017 Team Ranking". Rivals.

== Roster ==
2017–18 Marshall Thundering Herd men's basketball team
Players
Coaches

Pos.	#	Name	Height	Weight	Year	Previous school	Hometown
F	0	Christian Thieneman	6 ft 5 in (1.96 m)	195 lb (88 kg)	RS So	Trinity	Louisville, Kentucky
F	1	Dani Koljanin	6 ft 8 in (2.03 m)	220 lb (100 kg)	Jr	Monroe	Pula, Croatia
F	3	Jannson Williams	6 ft 9 in (2.06 m)	205 lb (93 kg)	RS Fr	Newnan	Newnan, Georgia
G	4	Christian Villers (W)	6 ft 3 in (1.91 m)	180 lb (82 kg)	Fr	Ashland	Ashland, Kentucky
G	5	Marcus Reed (W)	6 ft 0 in (1.83 m)	175 lb (79 kg)	Sr	Riverside	Charleston, West Virginia
F	11	Ajdin Penava	6 ft 9 in (2.06 m)	220 lb (100 kg)	Jr	Fifth High School	Sarajevo, Bosnia and Herzegovina
G	12	Ot Elmore	6 ft 2 in (1.88 m)	197 lb (89 kg)	RS Sr	Texas–Rio Grande Valley	Charleston, West Virginia
G	13	Jarrod West	5 ft 11 in (1.8 m)	179 lb (81 kg)	Fr	Notre Dame HS	Clarksburg, West Virginia
G	14	C.J. Burks	6 ft 4 in (1.93 m)	195 lb (88 kg)	RS Jr	Hedgesville	Martinsburg, West Virginia
F	21	Darius George	6 ft 7 in (2.01 m)	200 lb (91 kg)	Fr	Robert E. Lee	Staunton, Virginia
G	23	Rondale Watson	6 ft 4 in (1.93 m)	185 lb (84 kg)	RS Jr	Wake Forest	Lewisburg, West Virginia
G	24	Will Fenton (W)	6 ft 6 in (1.98 m)	205 lb (93 kg)	Fr	Fayetteville	Fayetteville, West Virginia
G/F	32	Phil Bledsoe	6 ft 6 in (1.98 m)	220 lb (100 kg)	So	Wheeling Park	Wheeling, West Virginia
G	33	Jon Elmore	6 ft 3 in (1.91 m)	185 lb (84 kg)	Jr	VMI	Charleston, West Virginia
F	50	Milan Mijović	6 ft 9 in (2.06 m)	255 lb (116 kg)	Sr	Secondary Vocational School	Belgrade, Serbia

Head coach

- Dan D'Antoni (Marshall)

Assistant coach(es)

- Mark Cline (Wake Forest)
- Scott Rigot (Buffalo)
- Cornelius Jackson (Marshall)

Legend

- (C) Team captain
- (S) Suspended
- (I) Ineligible
- (W) Walk-on
- Injured
- Current redshirt

Roster
Last update: 11/11/2017

== Schedule and results ==
Date time, TV	Rank^{#}	Opponent^{#}	Result	Record	Site (attendance) city, state
Exhibition
Oct 29, 2017*; 4:00 pm		West Virginia Tech	W 99–81		Cam Henderson Center (4,820); Huntington, WV
Nov 5, 2017*; 7:00 pm		West Virginia Wesleyan	W 95–76		Cam Henderson Center (4,559); Huntington, WV
Non-conference regular season
Nov 10, 2017*; 8:00 pm		UT Martin; Global Sports Invitational	W 102–91 ^{OT}	1–0	Cam Henderson Center (5,754); Huntington, WV
Nov 13, 2017*; 7:00 pm		Southern; Global Sports Invitational	W 83–74	2–0	Cam Henderson Center (4,674); Huntington, WV
Nov 16, 2017*; 7:00 pm		at Morehead State	L 83–86	2–1	Ellis Johnson Arena (3,857); Morehead, KY
Nov 19, 2017*; 5:00 pm, BTN+		at Illinois; Global Sports Invitational	L 74–91	2–2	State Farm Center (10,022); Champaign, IL
Nov 22, 2017*; 8:00 pm		North Carolina Central; Global Sports Invitational	W 92–84	3–2	Cam Henderson Center (4,572); Huntington, WV
Nov 26, 2017*; 4:00 pm		Concord	W 106–70	4–2	Cam Henderson Center (4,654); Huntington, WV
Nov 29, 2017*; 7:00 pm		at William & Mary	L 104–114	4–3	Kaplan Arena (1,727); Williamsburg, VA
Dec 2, 2017*; 7:00 pm		Akron	W 86–64	5–3	Cam Henderson Center (5,104); Huntington, WV
Dec 5, 2017*; 7:00 pm		Chattanooga	W 70–66	6–3	Cam Henderson Center (4,811); Huntington, WV
Dec 9, 2017*; 7:00 pm, ESPN3		at Toledo	W 93–87	7–3	Savage Arena (4,369); Toledo, OH
Dec 16, 2017*; 8:00 pm		Ohio	W 99–96 ^{OT}	8–3	Cam Henderson Center (5,117); Huntington, WV
Dec 19, 2017*; 6:30 pm, FS1		at No. 9 Xavier	L 77–81	8–4	Cintas Center (10,431); Cincinnati, OH
Dec 22, 2017*; 7:00 pm		Eastern Kentucky	W 91–71	9–4	Cam Henderson Center (5,218); Huntington, WV
Conference USA regular season
Dec 28, 2017; 7:00 pm		Southern Miss	W 85–66	10–4 (1–0)	Cam Henderson Center (5,537); Huntington, WV
Dec 30, 2017; 7:00 pm, ESPN3		Louisiana Tech	W 78–65	11–4 (2–0)	Cam Henderson Center (5,683); Huntington, WV
Jan 6, 2018; 7:00 pm, STADIUM		Western Kentucky	L 87–112	11–5 (2–1)	Cam Henderson Center (6,826); Huntington, WV
Jan 11, 2018; 7:00 pm, ESPN3		at Charlotte	W 91–83	12–5 (3–1)	Dale F. Halton Arena (4,640); Charlotte, NC
Jan 13, 2018; 7:00 pm, ESPN3		at Old Dominion	L 76–82	12–6 (3–2)	Ted Constant Convocation Center (6,287); Norfolk, VA
Jan 18, 2018; 8:00 pm, beIN		Middle Tennessee	W 73–63	13–6 (4–2)	Cam Henderson Center (5,320); Huntington, WV
Jan 20, 2018; 7:00 pm		UAB	W 86–78 ^{OT}	14–6 (5–2)	Cam Henderson Center (6,740); Huntington, WV
Jan 27, 2018; 7:00 pm, STADIUM		at Western Kentucky	L 74–85	14–7 (5–3)	E. A. Diddle Arena (7,362); Bowling Green, KY
Feb 1, 2018; 8:00 pm, beIN		at UTSA	L 77–81	14–8 (5–4)	Convocation Center (1,042); San Antonio, TX
Feb 3, 2018; 9:00 pm		at UTEP	W 74–65	15–8 (6–4)	Don Haskins Center (6,061); El Paso, TX
Feb 8, 2018; 8:00 pm		FIU	W 76–66	16–8 (7–4)	Cam Henderson Center (5,078); Huntington, WV
Feb 10, 2018; 7:00 pm		Florida Atlantic	W 79–68	17–8 (8–4)	Cam Henderson Center (5,761); Huntington, WV
Feb 15, 2018; 8:00 pm		at Rice	W 93–80	18–8 (9–4)	Tudor Fieldhouse (1,694); Houston, TX
Feb 17, 2018; 6:00 pm		at North Texas	W 74–72	19–8 (10–4)	The Super Pit (4,115); Denton, TX
Feb 22, 2018; 7:00 pm, STADIUM		Old Dominion	L 79–84	19–9 (10–5)	Cam Henderson Center (5,829); Huntington, WV
Feb 24, 2018; 7:00 pm		Charlotte	W 103–75	20–9 (11–5)	Cam Henderson Center (6,575); Huntington, WV
Mar 1, 2018; 8:00 pm, beIN		at UAB	L 77–91	20–10 (11–6)	Bartow Arena (3,156); Birmingham, AL
Mar 3, 2018; 7:00 pm, STADIUM		at No. 24 Middle Tennessee	W 76–67	21–10 (12–6)	Murphy Center (10,050); Murfreesboro, TN
Conference USA tournament
Mar 8, 2018; 7:30 pm, STADIUM	(4)	vs. (5) UTSA; Quarterfinals	W 95–81	22–10	Ford Center at The Star (2,531); Frisco, TX
Mar 9, 2018; 1:30 pm, CBSSN	(4)	vs. (9) Southern Miss; Semifinals	W 85–75	23–10	Ford Center at The Star; Frisco, TX
Mar 10, 2018; 8:30 pm, CBSSN	(4)	vs. (3) Western Kentucky; Championship	W 67–66	24–10	Ford Center at The Star; Frisco, TX
NCAA tournament
Mar 16, 2018*; 1:30 pm, TNT	(13 E)	vs. (4 E) No. 16 Wichita State; First Round	W 81–75	25–10	Viejas Arena (10,892); San Diego, CA
Mar 18, 2018*; 9:40 pm, TBS	(13 E)	vs. (5 E) No. 15 West Virginia; Second Round/Rivalry	L 71–94	25–11	Viejas Arena (11,628); San Diego, CA
*Non-conference game. ^{#}Rankings from AP poll. (#) Tournament seedings in parentheses. E=East. All times are in Eastern Time.
