= 2017–18 Conference USA men's basketball season =

- League: NCAA Division I
- Sport: Basketball
- Teams: 14
- TV partner(s): CBS Sports Network, Stadium, beIN Sports, ESPN3

2017–18 NCAA Division I men's basketball season
- Regular season champions: Middle Tennessee
- Runners-up: Old Dominion
- Season MVP: Nick King

Tournament
- Champions: Marshall
- Runners-up: Western Kentucky
- Finals MVP: Jon Elmore

Basketball seasons
- 2016–17 2018–19

2017–18 Conference USA men's basketball standings
	Conf.				Overall
Team	W		L	PCT	W		L	PCT
Middle Tennessee	16	–	2	.889	25	–	8	.758
Old Dominion	15	–	3	.833	25	–	7	.781
Western Kentucky	14	–	4	.778	27	–	11	.711
Marshall †	12	–	6	.667	25	–	11	.694
UTSA	11	–	7	.611	20	–	15	.571
UAB	10	–	8	.556	20	–	13	.606
North Texas	8	–	10	.444	20	–	18	.526
FIU	8	–	10	.444	14	–	18	.438
Southern Miss	7	–	11	.389	16	–	18	.471
Louisiana Tech	7	–	11	.389	17	–	16	.515
Florida Atlantic	6	–	12	.333	12	–	19	.387
UTEP	6	–	12	.333	11	–	20	.355
Rice	4	–	14	.222	7	–	24	.226
Charlotte	2	–	16	.111	6	–	23	.207
† 2018 C-USA Tournament winner

The 2017–18 Conference USA men's basketball season began with practices in October 2017, followed by the start of the 2017–18 NCAA Division I men's basketball season in November. Conference play began in late December and concluded in early March.

Middle Tennessee claimed the outright regular season championship with a win over Western Kentucky on March 1, 2018. Old Dominion finished in second place in the regular season, one game behind the Blue Raiders.

Middle Tennessee's Nick King was named C-USA Player of the Year and UTSA's Steve Henson was named the Coach of the Year.

The C-USA tournament was held from March 7 through 10, 2018 at The Ford Center at The Star in Frisco, Texas. Marshall defeated Western Kentucky to win the tournament championship for the first time. As a result, the Thundering Herd received the conference's automatic bid to the NCAA tournament. No other C-USA school received an NCAA Tournament bid. The Herd went 1–1 in the Tournament. Middle Tennessee and Western Kentucky received a bid to the National Invitation Tournament. The teams combined go 4–2 in the NIT, with Western Kentucky advancing to the semifinals. North Texas and UTSA received bids to the CBI and CIT respectively.

== Head coaches ==
=== Coaching changes ===
On March 5, 2017, North Texas fired head coach Tony Benford after five years without a winning season. On March 13, the school hired Arkansas State head coach Grant McCasland to the same role.

On March 21, 2017, Rice head coach Mike Rhoades resigned to become the head coach at VCU. He finished at Rice with a three-year record of 47–52. On March 23, the school promoted assistant coach Scott Pera to head coach.

On November 27, 2017 UTEP dropped to 1–5 on the season, head coach Tim Floyd announced that he was retiring effective immediately. The school had previously announced a new athletic director, Jim Senter, a week prior, but Floyd said that had nothing to do with his decision. Assistant Phil Johnson was named interim head coach of the Miners the next day.

On December 14, 2017, Charlotte head coach Mark Price was fired after a 3–6 start to the season and was replaced by Houston Fancher. Fancher was named interim coach for the remainder of the season.

=== Coaches ===
Team	Head coach	Previous job	Year at school	Overall record	C-USA record	C-USA championships	NCAA Tournaments
Charlotte	Houston Fancher (interim)	Charlotte (asst.)	0	3–17	2–16	0	0
FIU	Anthony Evans	Norfolk State	5	65–94	33–55	0	0
Florida Atlantic	Michael Curry	Philadelphia 76ers (asst.)	4	39–84	19–53	0	0
Louisiana Tech	Eric Konkol	Miami (asst.)	3	63–36	33–21	0	0
Marshall	Dan D'Antoni	Los Angeles Lakers (asst.)	4	73–63	41–31	1	1
Middle Tennessee	Kermit Davis	LSU (asst.)	16	332–188	68–20	2	2
North Texas	Grant McCasland	Arkansas State	1	20–18	8–10	0	0
Old Dominion	Jeff Jones	American	5	114–58	61–27	0	0
Rice	Scott Pera	Rice (asst.)	1	7–24	4–14	0	0
Southern Miss	Doc Sadler	Iowa State (asst.)	4	38–81	21–50	0	0
UAB	Robert Ehsan	UAB (asst.)	2	37–29	19–17	0	0
UTEP	Phil Johnson (interim)	UTEP (asst.)	0	10–15	6–12	0	0
UTSA	Steve Henson	Oklahoma (asst.)	3	34–33	18–18	0	0
WKU	Rick Stansbury	Texas A&M (asst.)	2	42–28	23–13	0	0

Notes:

- All records, appearances, titles, etc. are from time with current school only.
- Year at school includes 2017–18 season.
- Overall and C-USA records are from time at current school and are through the end of the 2017–18 season.

== Preseason ==
=== Preseason Coaches Poll ===
Rank	Team
1.	Middle Tennessee (8)
2.	UAB (4)
3.	Louisiana Tech (2)
4.	Old Dominion
5.	UTEP
6.	Western Kentucky
7.	Marshall
8.	Charlotte
9.	UTSA
10.	Southern Miss
11.	North Texas
12.	Florida Atlantic
13.	Rice
14.	FIU

() first place votes

=== Preseason All-C-USA Team ===
Recipient	School
Daquan Bracey	La Tech
William Lee	UAB
Jon Elmore	Marshall
Justin Johnson	WKU
Chris Cokely	UAB
Jon Davis	Charlotte
Ahmad Caver	Old Dominion
Giddy Potts	Middle Tennessee
Jacobi Boykins	La Tech
Omega Harris	UTEP

== Conference schedules ==
=== Conference matrix ===
This table summarizes the head-to-head results between teams in conference play.

	Charlotte	FIU	FAU	LaTech	Marshall	MTSU	UNT	ODU	Rice	USM	UAB	UTEP	UTSA	WKU
vs. Charlotte	–	2–0	1–1	1–0	2–0	1–0	0–1	2–0	1–0	1–0	1–0	1–0	1–0	2–0
vs. FIU	0–2	–	1–1	0–1	1–0	1–0	1–1	2–0	1–1	0–1	1–0	1–0	0–1	1–0
vs. Florida Atlantic	1–1	1–1	–	1–0	1–0	1–0	1–1	2–0	1–1	1–0	1–0	0–1	0–1	1–0
vs. Louisiana Tech	0–1	1–0	0–1	–	1–0	2–0	0–1	1–0	0–1	1–1	1–1	1–1	2–0	1–0
vs. Marshall	0–2	0–1	0–1	0–1	–	0–2	0–1	2–0	0–1	0–1	1–1	0–1	1–0	2–0
vs. Middle Tennessee	0–1	0–1	0–1	0–2	2–0	–	0–1	0–1	0–1	0–2	0–2	0–1	0–1	0–2
vs. North Texas	1–0	1–1	1–1	1–0	1–0	1–0	–	1–0	0–2	1–0	0–1	1–1	0–2	1–0
vs. Old Dominion	0–2	0–2	0–2	0–1	0–2	1–0	0–1	–	0–1	0–1	0–1	0–1	0–1	2–0
vs. Rice	0–1	1–1	1–1	1–0	1–0	1–0	2–0	1–0	–	1–0	1–0	1–1	2–0	1–0
vs. Southern Miss	0–1	1–0	0–1	1–1	1–0	2–0	0–1	1–0	0–1	–	2–0	1–1	1–1	1–0
vs. UAB	0–1	0–1	0–1	1–1	1–1	2–0	1–0	1–0	0–1	0–2	–	0–1	1–0	1–1
vs. UTEP	0–1	0–1	1–0	1–1	1–0	1–0	1–1	1–0	1–1	1–1	1–0	–	2–0	1–0
vs. UTSA	0–1	1–0	1–0	0–2	0–1	1–0	2–0	1–0	0–2	1–1	0–1	0–2	–	0–1
vs. WKU	0–2	0–1	0–1	0–1	0–2	2–0	0–1	0–2	0–1	0–1	1–1	0–1	1–0	–
Total	2–16	8–10	6–12	7–11	12–6	16–2	8–10	15–3	4–14	7–11	10–8	6–12	11–7	14–4

=== Players of the Week ===
Throughout the conference regular season, the C-USA offices named one or two players of the week and one or two freshmen of the week each Monday.

Week	Player of the week	Freshman of the week
November 13, 2017	Jon Elmore, Marshall	Keaton Wallace, UTSA
November 20, 2017	Nick King, Middle Tennessee	Jhivvan Jackson, UTSA
November 27, 2017	Chris Cokley, UAB	Jake Ohmer, Western Kentucky
December 4, 2017	Jon Elmore, Marshall	Keaton Wallace, UTSA
December 11, 2017	Nick King, Middle Tennessee	Keaton Wallace, UTSA
December 18, 2017	Ajdin Penava, Marshall	Taveion Hollingsworth, Western Kentucky
December 26, 2017	Nick King, Middle Tennessee	Jhivvan Jackson, UTSA
January 2, 2018	Roosevelt Smart, North Texas	Jhivvan Jackson, UTSA
January 8, 2018	Darius Thompson, Western Kentucky	Jhivvan Jackson, UTSA
January 16, 2018	Roosevelt Smart, North Texas	Zack Byrant, UAB
January 22, 2018	C. J. Burks, Marshall	Anthony Duruji, Louisiana Tech
January 29, 2018	Ronald Delph, FAU	Jhivvan Jackson, UTSA
February 7, 2018	Brian Beard, FIU	Jhivvan Jackson, UTSA
February 12, 2018	Nick King, Middle Tennessee	Taveion Hollingsworth, Western Kentucky
February 19, 2018	C. J. Burks, Marshall	Jhivvan Jackson, UTSA
February 26, 2018	Jon Elmore, Marshall	Najja Hunter, Rice
March 4, 2018	Jon Davis, Charlotte; Trey Porter, Old Dominion	Zack Bryant, UAB

== All-C-USA honors and awards ==
Following the regular season, the conference selected outstanding performers based on a poll of league coaches.

Honor	Recipient
Player of the Year	Nick King, Middle Tennessee
Coach of the Year	Steve Henson, UTSA
Defensive Player of the Year	Ajdin Penava, Marshall
Freshman of the Year	Jhivvan Jackson, UTSA
Newcomer of the Year	Nick King, Middle Tennessee
Sixth Man of the Year	Deon Lyle, UTSA
All-C-USA First Team	Jon Elmore, Marshall
All-C-USA First Team	Nick King, Middle Tennessee
All-C-USA First Team	Ahmad Caver, Old Dominion
All-C-USA First Team	Chris Cokley, UAB
All-C-USA First Team	Justin Johnson, WKU
All-C-USA Second Team	C. J. Burks, Marshall
All-C-USA Second Team	Giddy Potts, Middle Tennessee
All-C-USA Second Team	Roosevelt Smart, North Texas
All-C-USA Second Team	Jhivvan Jackson, UTSA
All-C-USA Second Team	Darius Thompson, WKU
All-C-USA Third Team	Brian Beard, FIU
All-C-USA Third Team	Ronald Delph, FAU
All-C-USA Third Team	Jacobi Boykins, Louisiana Tech
All-C-USA Third Team	Ajdin Penava, Marshall
All-C-USA Third Team	B. J. Stith, Old Dominion
All-C-USA Defensive Team	Brian Beard, FIU
All-C-USA Defensive Team	Ajdin Penava, Marshall
All-C-USA Defensive Team	Tyrik Dixon, Middle Tennessee
All-C-USA Defensive Team	Ahmad Caver, Old Dominion
All-C-USA Defensive Team	William Lee, UAB
All-C-USA Freshman Team	Anthony Duruji, Louisiana Tech
All-C-USA Freshman Team	Zack Bryant, UAB
All-C-USA Freshman Team	Jhivvan Jackson, UTSA
All-C-USA Freshman Team	Keaton Wallace, UTSA
All-C-USA Freshman Team	Taveion Hollingsworth, WKU

== Postseason ==
=== C-USA Tournament ===
Only the top 12 conference teams were eligible for the tournament.

Session	Game	Matchup	Score	Television
First Round – Wednesday, March 7
1	1	No. 8 FIU vs. No. 9 Southern Miss	68–69	Stadium
1	2	No. 5 UTSA vs. No. 12 UTEP	71–58	Stadium
1	3	No. 7 North Texas vs. No. 10 Louisiana Tech	62–68	Stadium
1	4	No. 6 UAB vs. No. 11 Florida Atlantic	83–72	Stadium
Quarterfinals – Thursday, March 8
2	5	No. 1 Middle Tennessee vs. No. 9 Southern Miss	68–71^{OT}	Stadium
2	6	No. 4 Marshall vs. No. 5 UTSA	95–81	Stadium
2	7	No. 2 Old Dominion vs. No. 10 Louisiana Tech	62–58	Stadium
2	8	No. 3 Western Kentucky vs. No. 6 UAB	98–70	Stadium
Semifinals – Friday, March 9
3	9	No. 4 Marshall vs. No. 9 Southern Miss	85–75	CBSSN
3	10	No. 2 Old Dominion vs. No. 3 Western Kentucky	49–57	CBSSN
Championship – Saturday, March 10
4	11	No. 3 Western Kentucky vs. No. 4 Marshall	66–67	CBSSN

=== NCAA tournament ===
Seed	Region	School	First Four	First round	Second round	Sweet 16	Elite Eight	Final Four	Championship
13	East	Marshall	N/A	defeated (4) Wichita State 81–75	eliminated by (5) West Virginia 71–94				

=== National Invitation Tournament ===
Seed	Bracket	School	First round	Second round	Quarterfinals	Semifinals	Finals
3	Baylor	Middle Tennessee	defeated (6) Vermont 91–64	eliminated by (2) Louisville 68–84			
4	USC	Western Kentucky	defeated (5) Boston College 79–62	defeated (1) USC 79–75	defeated (2) Oklahoma State 92–84	eliminated by (2) Utah 64–69	
		W–L (%):	2–0 (1.000)	1–1 (.500)	1–0 (1.000)	0–1 (.000)	0–0 (–) Total: 4–2 (.667)
