= 2017–18 Florida Atlantic Owls men's basketball team =

American college basketball season

2017–18 Florida Atlantic Owls men's basketball
- Conference: Conference USA
- Record: 12–19 (6–12 C-USA)
- Head coach: Michael Curry (4th season)
- Assistant coaches: Charlemagne Gibbons; Ron Oliver; Jorge Sanz
- Home arena: FAU Arena

2017–18 Conference USA men's basketball standings
	Conf.				Overall
Team	W		L	PCT	W		L	PCT
Middle Tennessee	16	–	2	.889	25	–	8	.758
Old Dominion	15	–	3	.833	25	–	7	.781
Western Kentucky	14	–	4	.778	27	–	11	.711
Marshall †	12	–	6	.667	25	–	11	.694
UTSA	11	–	7	.611	20	–	15	.571
UAB	10	–	8	.556	20	–	13	.606
North Texas	8	–	10	.444	20	–	18	.526
FIU	8	–	10	.444	14	–	18	.438
Southern Miss	7	–	11	.389	16	–	18	.471
Louisiana Tech	7	–	11	.389	17	–	16	.515
Florida Atlantic	6	–	12	.333	12	–	19	.387
UTEP	6	–	12	.333	11	–	20	.355
Rice	4	–	14	.222	7	–	24	.226
Charlotte	2	–	16	.111	6	–	23	.207
† 2018 C-USA Tournament winner

The 2017–18 Florida Atlantic Owls men's basketball team represented Florida Atlantic University during the 2017–18 NCAA Division I men's basketball season. The Owls, led by fourth-year head coach Michael Curry, played their home games at the FAU Arena in Boca Raton, Florida as members of Conference USA (C-USA). They finished the season 12–19, 6–12 in C-USA play, to finish in a tie for 11th place. They lost in the first round of the C-USA tournament to UAB.

March 16, 2018, head coach Michael Curry was fired after four seasons at Florida Atlantic. On March 22, it was announced that the school had hired Florida assistant head coach Dusty May as head coach.

== Previous season ==
The Owls finished the 2016–17 season 10–20, 6–12 in C-USA play, to finish in a tie for 11th place. They lost in the first round of the C-USA tournament to Marshall.

== Offseason ==
=== Departures ===
Name	Number	Pos.	Height	Weight	Year	Hometown	Reason for departure
Adonis Filer	0	G	6'3"	195	RS Senior	Chicago Heights, IL	Graduated
Jeantal Cylla	1	G	6'6"	210	Sophomore	Lake Worth, TX	Transferred to UNC Wilmington
William Gibbons	4	G	6'1"	180	Junior	Lithonia, GA	Graduate transferred to Mid-America Christian
Nick Rutherford	10	G	6'3"	197	Sophomore	Allen, TX	Transferred to Monmouth
Frank Booker	11	G	6'4"	190	RS Junior	Augusta, GA	Graduate transferred to South Carolina
Marcus Neely	13	G	6'2"	215	RS Senior	Fort Lauderdale, FL	Graduated
Jordan Phillips	21	F	6'5"	195	Freshman	Colorado Springs, CO	Transferred to Coastal Alabama CC
Jesse Hill	24	F	6'8"	225	Sophomore	Waretown, NJ	Graduate transferred to Tarleton State
Connor Shorten	30	F	6'9"	245	Sophomore	Gladstone, NJ	Left the team for personal reasons

=== Incoming transfers ===
Name	Number	Pos.	Height	Weight	Year	Hometown	Previous school
Payton Hulsey	0	G	6'5"	215	Senior	Memphis, TN	Transferred from College of Charleston. Will be eligible to play immediately since Hulsey graduated from College of Charleston.
Je'Quan Perry	1	G	6'4"	215	Junior	Charleston, SC	Junior college transferred from Spartanburg Methodist
Anthony Adger	3	G	6'1"	185	RS Junior	Anderson, SC	Junior college transferred from Spartanburg Methodist
Simeon Lepichev	21	F	6'10"	235	Junior	Sofia, Bulgaria	Junior college transferred from Kankakee CC
Amir Smith	32	F	6'6"		Junior	Houston, TX	Junior college transferred from State Fair CC

=== 2017 recruiting class ===
College recruiting information
Name	Hometown	School	Height	Weight	Commit date
Byron Abrams; PG	Conyers, GA	Heritage High School	6 ft 3 in (1.91 m)	175 lb (79 kg)	Mar 21, 2016
Byron Abrams; PG	Recruit ratings: Scout: Rivals: (NR)				
Chisom Obidike; C	Uwani, Nigeria	Comenius School	6 ft 10 in (2.08 m)	214 lb (97 kg)	Mar 21, 2016
Chisom Obidike; C	Recruit ratings: Scout: Rivals: (NR)				
Overall recruit ranking:
Note: In many cases, Scout, Rivals, 247Sports, On3, and ESPN may conflict in their listings of height and weight.; In these cases, the average was taken. ESPN grades are on a 100-point scale.; Sources: "2017 Team Ranking". Rivals.

== Roster ==
2017–18 Florida Atlantic Owls men's basketball team
Players
Coaches

Pos.	#	Name	Height	Weight	Year	Previous school	Hometown
G	0	Payton Hulsey	6 ft 5 in (1.96 m)	215 lb (98 kg)	RS Sr	Southwind/College of Charleston	Memphis, TN
G	1	Je'Quan Perry	6 ft 4 in (1.93 m)	220 lb (100 kg)	Jr	Charleston Collegiate; Spartanburg Methodist College	Charleston, SC
G	2	Jason Massey	6 ft 4 in (1.93 m)	190 lb (86 kg)	RS Sr	American Heritage; Brown	Cooper City, FL
G	3	Anthony Adger	6 ft 1 in (1.85 m)	180 lb (82 kg)	RS Jr	Crescent; Spartanburg Methodist College	Anderson, SC
G	4	Byron Abrams	6 ft 3 in (1.91 m)	185 lb (84 kg)	Fr	Heritage	Decatur, GA
F	5	William Pfister	6 ft 10 in (2.08 m)	230 lb (104 kg)	Sr	NW Florida State	Strasbourg, France
G	10	Devorious Brown	6 ft 2 in (1.88 m)	195 lb (88 kg)	So	Morgan County	Madison, GA
F	11	Tre' Maloney (W)	6 ft 7 in (2.01 m)	208 lb (94 kg)	RS So	Dillard; Georgia Highlands College	Fort Lauderdale, FL
G	14	Gerdarius Troutman	6 ft 3 in (1.91 m)	175 lb (79 kg)	Sr	Taylor County; Georgia Highlands College	Butler, GA
F	15	Jailyn Ingram	6 ft 7 in (2.01 m)	215 lb (98 kg)	So	Morgan County	Madison, GA
F/C	21	Simeon Lepichev	6 ft 9 in (2.06 m)	226 lb (103 kg)	Jr	Kankakee CC	Sofia, Bulgaria
C	30	Kevin Rostamian	6 ft 8 in (2.03 m)	270 lb (122 kg)	So	Cypress Bay; Hillsborough CC	Weston, FL
F	32	Amir Smith	6 ft 6 in (1.98 m)	210 lb (95 kg)	Jr	Ridge Point; State Fair CC	Houston, TX
C	33	Ronald Delph	7 ft 0 in (2.13 m)	245 lb (111 kg)	RS Sr	Lake Region; Auburn	Winter Haven, FL
C	35	Chisom Obidike	6 ft 10 in (2.08 m)	214 lb (97 kg)	Fr	Comenius School	Uwani, Nigeria

Head coach

- Michael Curry (Georgia Southern)

Assistant coach(es)

- Charlemagne Gibbons (Auburn Montgomery)
- Ron Oliver (Michigan)
- Jorge Sanz (Florida Atlantic)

Legend

- (C) Team captain
- (S) Suspended
- (I) Ineligible
- (W) Walk-on
- Injured
- Current redshirt

Roster
Last update: August 24, 2024

== Schedule and results ==
Date time, TV	Rank^{#}	Opponent^{#}	Result	Record	Site (attendance) city, state
Exhibition
November 4, 2017*; 4:30 p.m., ESPN3		at Lynn	W 68–53		de Hoernle Center; Boca Raton, FL
Non-conference regular season
November 10, 2017*; 8:00 p.m., ESPN3		at South Florida	L 59–60	0–1	USF Sun Dome (4,192); Tampa, FL
November 16, 2017*; 11:00 a.m.		Edward Waters	W 91–59	1–1	FAU Arena (1,791); Boca Raton, FL
November 20, 2017*; 7:30 p.m.		vs. Towson; Gulf Coast Showcase quarterfinals	L 52–76	1–2	Germain Arena (823); Estero, FL
November 21, 2017*; 1:30 p.m.		vs. Northern Illinois; Gulf Coast Showcase consolation 2nd round	W 77–67	2–2	Germain Arena (841); Estero, FL
November 22, 2017*; 1:30 p.m.		vs. Missouri State; Gulf Coast Showcase 5th-place game	L 60–71	2–3	Germain Arena (868); Estero, FL
November 28, 2017*; 3:30 p.m.		Ave Maria	W 91–54	3–3	FAU Arena; Boca Raton, FL
December 2, 2017*; 7:00 p.m.		Bethune–Cookman	W 93–75	4–3	FAU Arena (881); Boca Raton, FL
December 5, 2017*; 7:00 p.m.		at Florida Gulf Coast	W 92–88	5–3	Alico Arena (3,418); Fort Myers, FL
December 10, 2017*; 12:00 p.m.		Webber International	W 106–46	6–3	FAU Arena; Boca Raton, FL
December 16, 2017*; 7:00 p.m.		Arkansas State	L 63–64	6–4	FAU Arena; Boca Raton, FL
December 19, 2017*; 8:00 p.m., FSSW+		at No. 21 Texas Tech	L 54–90	6–5	United Supermarkets Arena (7,731); Lubbock, TX
December 23, 2017*; 3:30 p.m., BTN		at Minnesota	L 60–95	6–6	Williams Arena (12,357); Minneapolis, MN
Conference USA regular season
December 30, 2017; 7:00 p.m.		at FIU	L 57–58	0–1 (6–7)	FIU Arena (589); Miami, Florida
January 4, 2018; 7:00 p.m.		UAB	L 44–75	6–8 (0–2)	FAU Arena (1,091); Boca Raton, FL
January 6, 2018; 5:00 p.m.		Middle Tennessee	L 57–61	6–9 (0–3)	FAU Arena; Boca Raton, FL
January 11, 2018; 9:00 p.m.		at UTEP	W 73–66	7–9 (1–3)	Don Haskins Center (5,643); El Paso, TX
January 13, 2018; 3:00 p.m.		at UTSA	W 73–69	8–9 (2–3)	Convocation Center (985); San Antonio, TX
January 18, 2018; 7:00 p.m.		Charlotte	W 75–64	9–9 (3–3)	FAU Arena (1,307); Boca Raton, FL
January 21, 2018; 2:00 p.m.		Old Dominion	L 62–73	9–10 (3–4)	FAU Arena (1,307); Boca Raton, FL
January 25, 2018; 8:00 p.m., ESPN3		at North Texas	L 53–59	9–11 (3–5)	The Super Pit (1,952); Denton, TX
January 27, 2018; 3:00 p.m.		at Rice	W 63–62	10–11 (4–5)	Tudor Fieldhouse (1,866); Houston, TX
February 1, 2018; 7:00 p.m., Stadium		Louisiana Tech	L 62–67	10–12 (4–6)	FAU Arena (1,472); Boca Raton, FL
February 3, 2018; 7:00 p.m.		Southern Miss	L 66–77	10–13 (4–7)	FAU Arena (1,559); Boca Raton, FL
February 8, 2018; 8:30 p.m.		at Western Kentucky	L 63–75	10–14 (4–8)	E. A. Diddle Arena (5,617); Bowling Green, KY
February 10, 2018; 7:00 p.m.		at Marshall	L 68–79	10–15 (4–9)	Cam Henderson Center (5,761); Huntington, WV
February 17, 2018; 2:00 p.m.		FIU	W 77–72	11–15 (5–9)	FAU Arena (1,198); Boca Raton, FL
February 22, 2018; 7:00 p.m.		Rice	L 76–79 ^{OT}	11–16 (5–10)	FAU Arena (1,188); Boca Raton, FL
February 24, 2018; 7:00 p.m.		North Texas	W 74–54	12–16 (6–10)	FAU Arena (1,221); Boca Raton, FL
March 1, 2018; 7:00 p.m., ESPN3		at Old Dominion	L 64–69	12–17 (6–11)	Ted Constant Convocation Center (6,673); Norfolk, VA
March 3, 2018; 7:30 p.m.		at Charlotte	L 78–85	12–18 (6–12)	Dale F. Halton Arena (4,587); Charlotte, NC
Conference USA tournament
March 7, 2018; 9:00 p.m., Stadium	(11)	vs. (6) UAB; First round	L 73–82	12–19	The Ford Center at The Star; Frisco, TX
*Non-conference game. ^{#}Rankings from AP poll. (#) Tournament seedings in parentheses. All times are in Eastern.
