= 2018 Conference USA men's basketball tournament =

- Classification: Division I
- Season: 2017–18
- Teams: 12
- Site: Ford Center at The Star; Frisco, Texas
- Champions: Marshall (1st title)
- Winning coach: Dan D'Antoni (1st title)
- MVP: Jon Elmore (Marshall)
- Television: Stadium, CBSSN

2017–18 Conference USA men's basketball standings
	Conf.				Overall
Team	W		L	PCT	W		L	PCT
Middle Tennessee	16	–	2	.889	25	–	8	.758
Old Dominion	15	–	3	.833	25	–	7	.781
Western Kentucky	14	–	4	.778	27	–	11	.711
Marshall †	12	–	6	.667	25	–	11	.694
UTSA	11	–	7	.611	20	–	15	.571
UAB	10	–	8	.556	20	–	13	.606
North Texas	8	–	10	.444	20	–	18	.526
FIU	8	–	10	.444	14	–	18	.438
Southern Miss	7	–	11	.389	16	–	18	.471
Louisiana Tech	7	–	11	.389	17	–	16	.515
Florida Atlantic	6	–	12	.333	12	–	19	.387
UTEP	6	–	12	.333	11	–	20	.355
Rice	4	–	14	.222	7	–	24	.226
Charlotte	2	–	16	.111	6	–	23	.207
† 2018 C-USA Tournament winner

The 2018 Conference USA men's basketball tournament was the postseason men's basketball tournament for Conference USA for the 2017–18 NCAA Division I men's basketball season. It was held from March 7–10, 2018, in Frisco, Texas, at the Ford Center at The Star. In the first round and quarterfinals, two games were played simultaneously within the same arena, with the courts separated by a curtain.

The tournament was won by Marshall, who defeated Western Kentucky in the conference title game, earning the conference's automatic berth into the NCAA tournament, their first Conference USA Tournament title.

== Seeds ==
Only 12 conference teams were eligible for the tournament. The top four teams receive a bye to the quarterfinals of the tournament. Teams were seeded by record within the conference, with a tiebreaker system to seed teams with identical conference records.

Seed	School	Record	Tiebreaker
1	Middle Tennessee	16–2	
2	Old Dominion	15–3	
3	Western Kentucky	14–4	
4	Marshall	12–6	
5	UTSA	11–7	
6	UAB	10–8	
7	North Texas	8–10	1–0 vs. UAB
8	FIU	8–10	0–1 vs. UAB
9	Southern Miss	7–11	1–1 vs. UTSA
10	Louisiana Tech	7–11	0–2 vs. UTSA
11	Florida Atlantic	6–12	1–0 vs. UTEP
12	UTEP	6–12	0–1 vs. FAU

== Schedule ==
Rankings denote tournament seed.

Session	Game	Matchup	Score	Television
First Round – Wednesday, March 7
1	1	No. 8 FIU vs. No. 9 Southern Miss	68–69	Stadium
1	2	No. 5 UTSA vs. No. 12 UTEP	71–58	Stadium
1	3	No. 7 North Texas vs. No. 10 Louisiana Tech	62–68	Stadium
1	4	No. 6 UAB vs. No. 11 Florida Atlantic	83–72	Stadium
Quarterfinals – Thursday, March 8
2	5	No. 1 Middle Tennessee vs. No. 9 Southern Miss	68–71^{OT}	Stadium
2	6	No. 4 Marshall vs. No. 5 UTSA	95–81	Stadium
2	7	No. 2 Old Dominion vs. No. 10 Louisiana Tech	62–58	Stadium
2	8	No. 3 Western Kentucky vs. No. 6 UAB	98–70	Stadium
Semifinals – Friday, March 9
3	9	No. 4 Marshall vs. No. 9 Southern Miss	85–75	CBSSN
3	10	No. 2 Old Dominion vs. No. 3 Western Kentucky	49–57	CBSSN
Championship – Saturday, March 10
4	11	No. 3 Western Kentucky vs. No. 4 Marshall	66–67	CBSSN

== Bracket ==
First round Wednesday, March 7 Stadium
8	FIU	68
9	Southern Miss	69
5	UTSA	71
12	UTEP	58
7	North Texas	62
10	Louisiana Tech	68
6	UAB	83
11	Florida Atlantic	72

Quarterfinals; Thursday, March 8 Stadium
1	Middle Tennessee	68
9	Southern Miss	71*
4	Marshall	95
5	UTSA	81
2	Old Dominion	62
10	Louisiana Tech	58
3	Western Kentucky	98
6	UAB	70

Semifinals; Friday, March 9 CBSSN
9	Southern Miss	75
4	Marshall	85
2	Old Dominion	49
3	Western Kentucky	57

Championship; Saturday, March 10; CBSSN
4	Marshall	67
3	Western Kentucky	66

* denotes overtime period.

== See also ==
- 2018 Conference USA women's basketball tournament
