= 2017–18 Louisiana Tech Bulldogs basketball team =

American college basketball season

2017–18 Louisiana Tech Bulldogs basketball

Cancún Challenge Riviera Division champions New Orleans Shootout champions
- Conference: Conference USA
- Record: 17–16 (7–11 C-USA)
- Head coach: Eric Konkol (3rd season)
- Assistant coaches: Duffy Conroy; Yaphett King; Tony Skinn
- Home arena: Thomas Assembly Center

2017–18 Conference USA men's basketball standings
	Conf.				Overall
Team	W		L	PCT	W		L	PCT
Middle Tennessee	16	–	2	.889	25	–	8	.758
Old Dominion	15	–	3	.833	25	–	7	.781
Western Kentucky	14	–	4	.778	27	–	11	.711
Marshall †	12	–	6	.667	25	–	11	.694
UTSA	11	–	7	.611	20	–	15	.571
UAB	10	–	8	.556	20	–	13	.606
North Texas	8	–	10	.444	20	–	18	.526
FIU	8	–	10	.444	14	–	18	.438
Southern Miss	7	–	11	.389	16	–	18	.471
Louisiana Tech	7	–	11	.389	17	–	16	.515
Florida Atlantic	6	–	12	.333	12	–	19	.387
UTEP	6	–	12	.333	11	–	20	.355
Rice	4	–	14	.222	7	–	24	.226
Charlotte	2	–	16	.111	6	–	23	.207
† 2018 C-USA Tournament winner

The 2017–18 Louisiana Tech Bulldogs basketball team represented Louisiana Tech University during the 2017–18 NCAA Division I men's basketball season. The Bulldogs, led by third-year head coach Eric Konkol, played their home games at the Thomas Assembly Center in Ruston, Louisiana as members of Conference USA. They finished the season 17–16, 7–11 in C-USA play to finish in a tie for ninth place. As the No. 10 seed in the C-USA tournament, they defeated North Texas before losing to Old Dominion in the quarterfinals.

== Previous season ==
The Bulldogs finished the 2016–17 season 23–10, 14–4 in C-USA play to finish in second place. They beat UAB in the quarterfinals of the C-USA Tournament before losing to Marshall in the semifinals. Despite finishing with 23 wins, the school declined to participate in a postseason tournament marking the first time since 2013 that they did not participate in a postseason tournament.

== Offseason ==
=== Departures ===
Name	Number	Pos.	Height	Weight	Year	Hometown	Reason for departure
Erik McCree	2	F	6'8"	225	RS Senior	Orlando, FL	Graduated
Da'Shawn Robinson	23	G	6'4"	210	Senior	Houston, TX	Graduate transferred to Lamar
Omar Sherman	24	F	6'9"	255	Junior	Duncanville, TX	Transferred to William Penn
Qiydar Davis	25	G	6'6"	220	RS Senior	Atlanta, GA	Graduate transferred to Indiana State
Luke Walker	30	G	6'2"	185	Sophomore	New Orleans, LA	Walk-on; graduate transferred to William Jessup

=== Incoming transfers ===
Name	Number	Pos.	Height	Weight	Year	Hometown	Previous school
Harrison Curry	24	F	6'7"	230	Junior	Ann Arbor, MI	Junior college transferred from Pensacola State College
Kyle McKinley	25	F/C	6'10"	220	RS Sophomore	Stillwater, MN	Junior college transferred from Northeast CC

=== Recruiting class of 2017 ===
College recruiting information
Name	Hometown	School	Height	Weight	Commit date
Anthony Duruji #80 PF	Potomac, MD	St. Andrews Episcopal School	6 ft 7 in (2.01 m)	190 lb (86 kg)	May 17, 2016
Anthony Duruji #80 PF	Recruit ratings: Scout: Rivals: ESPN:				
Exavian Christon; SG	Hot Springs, AR	Hot Springs High School	6 ft 4 in (1.93 m)	190 lb (86 kg)	Sep 21, 2016
Exavian Christon; SG	Recruit ratings: Scout: Rivals: ESPN:				
Amorie Archibald; SG	Deltona, FL	Trinity Christian Academy	6 ft 3 in (1.91 m)	180 lb (82 kg)	Sep 30, 2016
Amorie Archibald; SG	Recruit ratings: Scout: Rivals: ESPN:				
Overall recruit ranking:
Note: In many cases, Scout, Rivals, 247Sports, On3, and ESPN may conflict in their listings of height and weight.; In these cases, the average was taken. ESPN grades are on a 100-point scale.; Sources: "2017 Team Ranking". Rivals.

== Roster ==
2017–18 Louisiana Tech Bulldogs men's basketball team
Players
Coaches

Pos.	#	Name	Height	Weight	Year	Previous school	Hometown
G	0	Jacobi Boykins	6 ft 6 in (1.98 m)	175 lb (79 kg)	Sr	Lakewood High School	St. Petersburg, Florida
G	1	Derric Jean	6 ft 2 in (1.88 m)	190 lb (86 kg)	Jr	McArthur High School	Miami, Florida
G	3	Jalen Harris	6 ft 4 in (1.93 m)	195 lb (88 kg)	So	Duncanville High School	Duncanville, Texas
G	4	DaQuan Bracey	5 ft 11 in (1.8 m)	174 lb (79 kg)	So	St. Frances Academy	Baltimore, Maryland
C	5	Joniah White	7 ft 0 in (2.13 m)	215 lb (98 kg)	RS Jr	Grenada High School	Duck Hill, Mississippi
F	10	Anthony Duruji	6 ft 7 in (2.01 m)	198 lb (90 kg)	Fr	St. Andrew's Episcopal School	Germantown, Maryland
G	11	JaColby Pemberton	6 ft 5 in (1.96 m)	180 lb (82 kg)	RS Fr	Lancaster High School	Dallas, Texas
G	15	Jeremiah Taylor (W)	6 ft 4 in (1.93 m)	200 lb (91 kg)	So	Lewisville High School	Lewisville, Texas
G	21	Exavian Christon	6 ft 4 in (1.93 m)	197 lb (89 kg)	Fr	Hot Springs High School	Hot Springs, Arkansas
F	22	Jy'lan Washington	6 ft 9 in (2.06 m)	195 lb (88 kg)	Jr	Stewarts Creek High School	Smyrna, Tennessee
F	24	Harrison Curry	6 ft 7 in (2.01 m)	230 lb (104 kg)	Jr	Pensacola State College	Ann Arbor, Michigan
C	25	Kyle McKinley	6 ft 10 in (2.08 m)	230 lb (104 kg)	RS So	Northeast Community College	Stillwater, Minnesota
F	35	Oliver Powell	6 ft 8 in (2.03 m)	230 lb (104 kg)	So	Rowlett High School	Rowlett, Texas

Head coach

- Eric Konkol (UW–Eau Claire)

Assistant coach(es)

- Duffy Conroy (St. Ambrose)
- Yaphett King (Cal State Fullerton)
- Tony Skinn (George Mason)

Legend

- (C) Team captain
- (S) Suspended
- (I) Ineligible
- (W) Walk-on
- Injured
- Current redshirt

Roster

== Schedule and results ==
Date time, TV	Rank^{#}	Opponent^{#}	Result	Record	Site (attendance) city, state
Non-conference regular season
Nov 10, 2017*; 6:30 pm		UT Tyler	W 112–71	1–0	Thomas Assembly Center (3,271); Ruston, LA
Nov 13, 2017*; 6:30 pm		Southeast Missouri State; Cancún Challenge	W 96–95 ^{OT}	2–0	Thomas Assembly Center (2,456); Ruston, LA
Nov 18, 2017*; 7:00 pm		Montana State; Cancún Challenge	W 71–58	3–0	Thomas Assembly Center (2,378); Ruston, LA
Nov 21, 2017*; 5:00 pm, CBSSN		vs. George Mason; Cancún Challenge Riviera Division semifinals	W 77–64	4–0	Hard Rock Hotel Riviera Convention Center (842); Cancún, Mexico
Nov 22, 2017*; 7:30 pm, CBSSN		vs. Evansville; Cancún Challenge Riviera Division championship	W 63–61	5–0	Hard Rock Hotel Riviera Convention Center (982); Cancún, Mexico
Nov 29, 2017*; 7:00 pm, SECN+		at No. 24 Alabama	L 74–77	5–1	Coleman Coliseum (12,062); Tuscaloosa, AL
Dec 2, 2017*; 6:00 pm		Miles	W 106–55	6–1	Thomas Assembly Center (2,665); Ruston, LA
Dec 6, 2017*; 6:30 pm		Stephen F. Austin	L 83–85	6–2	Thomas Assembly Center (3,041); Ruston, LA
Dec 9, 2017*; 6:00 pm		Jackson State	W 91–62	7–2	Thomas Assembly Center (2,668); Ruston, LA
Dec 12, 2017*; 6:30 pm		Louisiana	L 71–75	7–3	Thomas Assembly Center (3,438); Ruston, LA
Dec 16, 2017*; 1:00 pm, LHN		at Texas	L 60–75	7–4	Frank Erwin Center (8,828); Austin, TX
Dec 21, 2017*; 2:30 pm		vs. Alabama State; New Orleans Shootout semifinals	W 74–62	8–4	Convocation Center (300); New Orleans, LA
Dec 22, 2017*; 2:30 pm		vs. Fort Wayne; New Orleans Shootout championship	W 85–76	9–4	Convocation Center (250); New Orleans, LA
Conference USA regular season
Dec 28, 2017; 7:00 pm, beIN		at Western Kentucky	L 68–69	9–5 (0–1)	E. A. Diddle Arena (4,897); Bowling Green, KY
Dec 30, 2017; 6:00 pm, ESPN3		at Marshall	L 65–78	9–6 (0–2)	Cam Henderson Center (5,683); Huntington, WV
Jan 4, 2018; 6:30 pm, Stadium		UTSA	L 76–78	9–7 (0–3)	Thomas Assembly Center (3,159); Ruston, LA
Jan 6, 2018; 6:00 pm		UTEP	W 97–88	10–7 (1–3)	Thomas Assembly Center (3,654); Ruston, LA
Jan 11, 2018; 8:00 pm, CBSSN		at Middle Tennessee	L 57–72	10–8 (1–4)	Murphy Center (4,418); Murfreesboro, TN
Jan 13, 2018; 4:00 pm, Stadium		at UAB	L 62–74	10–9 (1–5)	Bartow Arena (3,743); Birmingham, AL
Jan 18, 2018; 6:30 pm, Stadium		North Texas	W 66–65	11–9 (2–5)	Thomas Assembly Center (4,236); Ruston, LA
Jan 20, 2018; 6:00 pm		Rice	W 69–54	12–9 (3–5)	Thomas Assembly Center (3,836); Ruston, LA
Jan 27, 2018; 6:00 pm		Southern Miss	W 89–66	13–9 (4–5)	Thomas Assembly Center (4,269); Ruston, LA
Feb 1, 2018; 6:00 pm, Stadium		at Florida Atlantic	W 67–62	14–9 (5–5)	FAU Arena (1,472); Boca Raton, FL
Feb 3, 2018; 6:00 pm		at FIU	L 68–71	14–10 (5–6)	FIU Arena (2,463); Miami, FL
Feb 8, 2018; 7:00 pm, beIN		Charlotte	W 83–65	15–10 (6–6)	Thomas Assembly Center (3,657); Ruston, LA
Feb 10, 2018; 6:00 pm, Stadium		Old Dominion	L 69–82	15–11 (6–7)	Thomas Assembly Center (4,031); Ruston, LA
Feb 15, 2018; 8:00 pm, CBSSN		UAB	W 73–60	16–11 (7–7)	Thomas Assembly Center (3,562); Ruston, LA
Feb 17, 2018; 6:00 pm, Stadium		Middle Tennessee	L 70–87	16–12 (7–8)	Thomas Assembly Center (4,847); Ruston, LA
Feb 22, 2018; 6:00 pm, Stadium		at UTEP	L 72–74	16–13 (7–9)	Don Haskins Center (5,386); El Paso, TX
Feb 24, 2018; 7:30 pm		at UTSA	L 64–74	16–14 (7–10)	Convocation Center (1,624); San Antonio, TX
Mar 3, 2018; 4:00 pm		at Southern Miss	L 64–72	16–15 (7–11)	Reed Green Coliseum (2,687); Hattiesburg, MS
Conference USA tournament
Mar 7, 2018; 8:30 pm, Stadium	(10)	vs. (7) North Texas; First round	W 68–62	17–15	The Ford Center at The Star; Frisco, TX
Mar 8, 2018; 8:30 pm, Stadium	(10)	vs. (2) Old Dominion; Quarterfinals	L 58–62	17–16	The Ford Center at The Star; Frisco, TX
*Non-conference game. (#) Tournament seedings in parentheses. All times are in Central Time.
