= Beach Ball Classic =

The Beach Ball Classic is an annual high school basketball competition hosted in Myrtle Beach, South Carolina.

== History ==
The Beach Ball Classic was founded by then Socastee High School basketball coach Dan D'Antoni in 1981 in order to bring more high school competition to the east coast. "The Classic," as it is known locally, began as an eight team competition featuring four teams from South Carolina and four teams from other states; thanks to strong community support, however, it quickly evolved into a 16-team national holiday event. In 1998, the Classic committee decided to add a women's tournament which added to its already high competition. The "Classic" is held right after Christmas every year, lasting roughly four or five days until the new year hits. The Crescent Bank Holiday Invitational is held before Christmas and features the newly added women's tournament. The Invitational also feature the Carolina Challenge, which is an eight team tournament of the local women's colleges.

== Location, accommodations, and tickets ==
The Beach Ball Classic is held at the Myrtle Beach Convention Center every year before and after Christmas. Crown Reef Resort at South Beach Resort is a major accommodation for travelers who want to spend their Christmas at the Classic. They offer specials for fans along with other little extras which change yearly.

Tickets are purchased at the Myrtle Beach Convention Center the day of the game with general admission starting at $12.00 and reserved seating at $15.00 per game. They also offer books of tickets for the classic games as well as the Crescent Bank Holiday Invitational games starting at $75.00 for the Classic and $15.00 for the Invitational. The Crescent Banks in the area also offer a limited number of free tickets to the Invitational games. Another feature that has been added is the Carolina Challenge. This eight team tournament features some of the local women's colleges and tickets are priced at $10.00.

== Players ==
The Classic has featured many past and present NBA stars.

Vince Carter played for Mainland (Fla.). At the 1994 Beach Ball Classic, Carter broke his hand in the opening game and played the remainder of the tournament left-handed. Carter played in the NBA for 13 years, winning the 1999 NBA Rookie of the Year Award and the 2000 Slam Dunk Contest. He is one of the players who has participated in the Classic.

From Simon Gratz (Pa.), Rasheed Wallace. Wallace was a three-time Beach Baller who led his team to two tourney titles while setting records for most blocked shots in a game (16) and tournament (24). Wallace has been to the NBA Finals twice but only winning once with the Detroit Pistons. Wallace is currently the all-time leader in the NBA with most technical fouls at 304.

From Lower Merion (Pa.), Kobe Bryant. Bryant dominated while playing in the Classic, accumulating 43 points in one game then leading his one-man team to a state title and going straight to the NBA. Now the youngest player to ever reach 33,000 points in an NBA career, he has since retired with five NBA Finals Championships.

From Latta (S.C.), Raymond Felton. Felton orchestrated one of the larger upsets in Beach Ball history when the Class A Vikings defeated nationally dominant DeMatha (Md.). Felton is one of the younger stars that play in the NBA and who played in the Classic. Felton was recently in a major 3-team trade which sent him to the Denver Nuggets from the New York Knicks. Felton now plays for the Oklahoma City Thunder.

== Sponsors ==
The Beach Ball Classic is and has been sponsored by major corporations ever since it started. Some of the major companies featured are: Enterprise Rent-A-Car, McDonald's, HTC (Horry Telephone Cooperative, Inc.), US Foodservice, TGI Fridays, Sonic Drive In, and Verizon Wireless. These companies help the tournament come together. In order to host anything it costs money and these companies are willing to invest into the Beach Ball Classic.
