= Dan D'Antoni =

American basketball coach (born 1947)

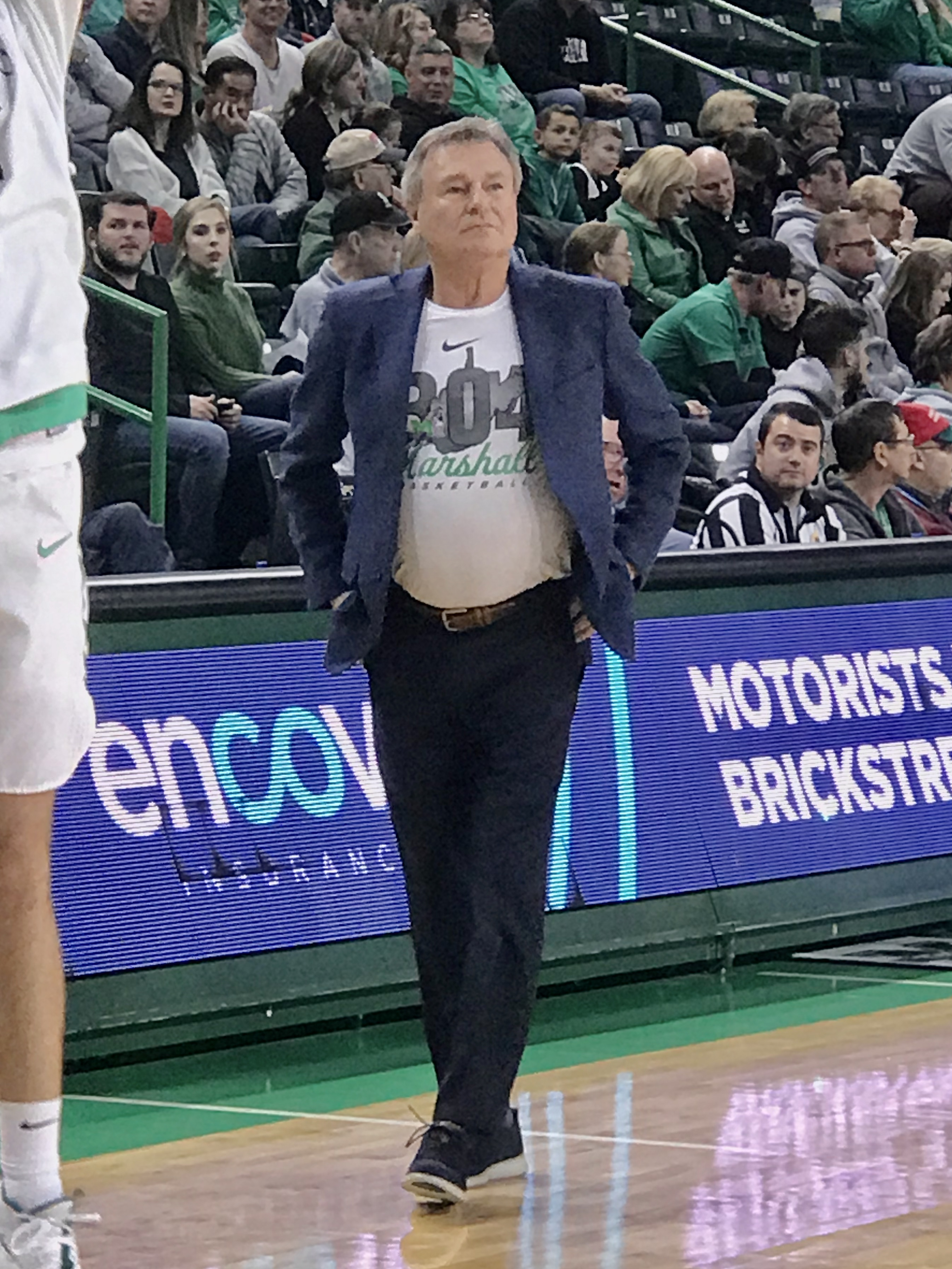
- D'Antoni in 2019

Biographical details
- Born: July 9, 1947 (age 79); Mullens, West Virginia, U.S.

Playing career
- 1967–1970: Marshall
- Position: Point guard

Coaching career (HC unless noted)
- 1970–1971: Marshall (assistant)
- 1975–2005: Socastee HS (SC)
- 2005–2008: Phoenix Suns (assistant)
- 2008–2012: New York Knicks (assistant)
- 2012–2014: Los Angeles Lakers (assistant)
- 2014–2024: Marshall

Head coaching record
- Overall: 177–148 (.545) (college)
- Tournaments: 1–1 (NCAA Division I); 4–0 (CIT)

Accomplishments and honors

Championships
- CIT (2019); C-USA tournament (2018)

Lewis Joseph "Dan" D'Antoni II (born July 9, 1947) is an American former basketball player and coach, who most recently served as head coach for the Marshall Thundering Herd men's basketball team. He was previously an assistant coach under his younger brother, Mike D'Antoni, with the NBA's Phoenix Suns, New York Knicks, and Los Angeles Lakers.

== Playing career ==
Born in Mullens, West Virginia, D'Antoni played college basketball at Marshall University from 1966 to 1970. He was the Thundering Herd's starting point guard from 1968 to 1970. He led the Herd with a 17.5 scoring average in 1968–69. In 1990, he was inducted into the Marshall University Athletics Hall of Fame.

== Coaching career ==
=== High school ===
After D'Antoni graduated from Marshall University, he joined the Herd's coaching staff as the head coach of the freshman basketball team coaching his brother Mike, before becoming an assistant coach of the varsity squad. After failing to make the Baltimore Bullets, he became the head basketball coach at Socastee High School in Myrtle Beach, South Carolina, in 1975. D'Antoni coached for 30 years at Socastee through 2005 and accumulated over 500 wins. He also founded the Beach Ball Classic, one of the most prestigious high school basketball tournaments in the country during his tenure. In 2016, he was elected into the South Carolina Basketball Coaches Hall of Fame.

=== NBA ===
In the summer of 2005, he became an assistant with the Phoenix Suns under younger brother Mike. Shortly after Mike accepted the head coaching position with the New York Knicks, D'Antoni was hired as an assistant with the Knicks. On March 15, 2012, D'Antoni and fellow assistant coach Phil Webber stepped down after Mike resigned as Knicks head coach. On November 15, 2012, he became an assistant coach with the Los Angeles Lakers, also under his brother. In addition to being an assistant coach, D’Antoni also served as the head coach of the Knicks’ and Lakers’ NBA Summer League teams.

=== Marshall ===
On April 24, 2014, D'Antoni was announced as the new head coach of Marshall University Thundering Herd men's basketball program, 43 years after he was an assistant with the Herd. He led the Thundering Herd to the Conference USA tournament championship game in 2017, where they were defeated by Middle Tennessee, who earned a spot in the NCAA tournament. On March 10, 2018, he led Marshall back to the Conference USA championship game, this time defeating Western Kentucky and earning an automatic bid in the NCAA tournament. It was Marshall's first appearance in the NCAA tournament since 1987.

On March 16, 2018, the 13th-seeded Herd defeated 4th-seeded Wichita State 81–75 in Marshall's opening game of the 2018 NCAA Tournament. It was the team's first-ever win in the tournament. In Round 2, Marshall lost 94–71 to West Virginia University, finishing the season with a 25–11 record. In 2019, he led Marshall to the CIT Championship.

On March 25, 2024, Marshall University Athletics announced it had parted ways with D’Antoni. Associate head coach Cornelius Jackson was announced as his successor on the same day.

== Personal life ==
D'Antoni graduated from Marshall in 1970 with a degree in Speech and Physical Education and also earned a master's degree in Principles of Guidance from Marshall in 1972.

His father, Lewis, was a high school basketball coach in West Virginia and Ohio, and was inducted into West Virginia's Sports Hall of Fame in May 2004.

D'Antoni is the father of three sons, all of whom played collegiate basketball: Matt played at Brown; Andrew attended Army and later served 3½ years in Iraq, rising to the rank of Major in the U.S. Army and is the current Executive Officer of the East Carolina University Army ROTC program; and Nick attended William & Mary, where he was captain of the basketball team. Dan and wife Vanessa are also parents of daughter Morgan.

== Head coaching record ==
Record table
Season	Team	Overall	Conference	Standing	Postseason
Marshall Thundering Herd (Conference USA) (2014–2022)
2014–15	Marshall	11–21	7–11	T–11th	
2015–16	Marshall	17–16	12–6	T–3rd	
2016–17	Marshall	20–15	10–8	6th	
2017–18	Marshall	25–11	12–6	4th	NCAA Division I Round of 32
2018–19	Marshall	23–14	11–7	6th	CIT champions
2019–20	Marshall	17–15	10–8	6th	
2020–21	Marshall	15–7	9–5	3rd (East)	
2021–22	Marshall	12–21	4–14	7th (East)	
Marshall Thundering Herd (Sun Belt Conference) (2022–2024)
2022–23	Marshall	24–8	13–5	T–2nd	
2023–24	Marshall	13–20	7–11	T–10th	
Marshall:		177–148 (.545)	95–81 (.540)		
Total:		177–148 (.545)			
National champion Postseason invitational champion Conference regular season champion Conference regular season and conference tournament champion Division regular season champion Division regular season and conference tournament champion Conference tournament champion
