= 2016–17 Conference USA men's basketball season =

- League: NCAA Division I
- Sport: Basketball
- Teams: 14
- TV partner(s): CBS Sports Network, American Sports Network, beIN Sports, Campus Insiders, ESPN3

2016–17 NCAA Division I men's basketball season
- Regular season champions: Middle Tennessee
- Runners-up: Louisiana Tech
- Season MVP: JaCorey Williams

Tournament
- Champions: Middle Tennessee
- Runners-up: Marshall
- Finals MVP: Giddy Potts

Basketball seasons
- 2015–16 2017–18

2016–17 Conference USA men's basketball standings
	Conf.				Overall
Team	W		L	PCT	W		L	PCT
Middle Tennessee †	17	–	1	.944	31	–	5	.861
Louisiana Tech	14	–	4	.778	23	–	10	.697
Old Dominion	12	–	6	.667	19	–	12	.613
UTEP	12	–	6	.667	15	–	17	.469
Rice	11	–	7	.611	23	–	12	.657
Marshall	10	–	8	.556	20	–	15	.571
UAB	9	–	9	.500	17	–	16	.515
Western Kentucky	9	–	9	.500	15	–	17	.469
UTSA	8	–	10	.444	14	–	19	.424
Charlotte	7	–	11	.389	13	–	17	.433
Florida Atlantic	6	–	12	.333	10	–	20	.333
Southern Miss	6	–	12	.333	9	–	22	.290
FIU	3	–	15	.167	7	–	24	.226
North Texas	2	–	16	.111	8	–	22	.267
† 2017 C-USA Tournament winner

The 2016–17 Conference USA men's basketball season began with practices in October 2016, followed by the start of the 2016–17 NCAA Division I men's basketball season in November. Conference play began in late December and concluded in early March.

Middle Tennessee claimed the outright regular season championship with a win over UAB on February 26, 2017. Louisiana Tech finished in second place in the regular season, three games behind the Blue Raiders.

Middle Tennessee's JaCorey Williams was named C-USA Player of the Year and Kermit Davis was named the Coach of the Year.

The C-USA tournament was held from March 8 through 11, 2017 at Legacy Arena in Birmingham, Alabama. Middle Tennessee defeated Marshall to win the tournament championship for the second consecutive year. As a result, the Blue Raiders received the conference's automatic bid to the NCAA tournament. No other C-USA school received an NCAA Tournament bid. Rice received a bid to the College Basketball Invitational tournament.

== Head coaches ==
=== Coaching changes ===
On March 10, 2016, after 10 years with UTSA, head coach Brooks Thompson was fired. He finished at UTSA with a record of 130–176. On April 1, the school hired Steve Henson as head coach.

On March 17, 2016, WKU head coach Ray Harper resigned after three players were suspended by a university disciplinary committee. He finished at WKU with a record of 90–62. On March 28, the school hired Rick Stansbury as head coach.

UAB head coach Jerod Haase left UAB to accept the head coaching position at Stanford. On April 4, 2016, the school hired Robert Ehsan, who had been an assistant under Haase at UAB, as head coach .

=== Coaches ===
Team	Head coach	Previous job	Year at school	Overall record	C-USA record	C-USA championships	NCAA Tournaments
Charlotte	Mark Price	Charlotte Bobcats (asst.)	2	27–36	16–20	0	0
FIU	Anthony Evans	Norfolk State	4	51–76	25–45	0	0
Florida Atlantic	Michael Curry	Philadelphia 76ers (asst.)	3	27–64	13–41	0	0
Louisiana Tech	Eric Konkol	Miami (asst.)	2	46–20	26–10	0	0
Marshall	Dan D'Antoni	Los Angeles Lakers (asst.)	3	48–52	29–25	0	0
Middle Tennessee	Kermit Davis	LSU (asst.)	15	307–179	52–18	2	2
North Texas	Tony Benford	Marquette (assoc. head coach)	5	62–95	23–49	0	0
Old Dominion	Jeff Jones	American	4	89–51	46–24	0	0
Rice	Mike Rhoades	VCU (assoc. head coach)	3	47–52	26–28	0	0
Southern Miss	Doc Sadler	Iowa State (asst.)	3	20–63	14–39	0	0
UAB	Robert Ehsan	UAB (asst.)	1	17–16	9–9	0	0
UTEP	Tim Floyd	USC	7	135–81	75–41	0	0
UTSA	Steve Henson	Oklahoma (asst.)	1	14–19	7–11	0	0
WKU	Rick Stansbury	Texas A&M (asst.)	1	15–17	9–9	0	0

Notes:

- All records, appearances, titles, etc. are from time with current school only.
- Year at school includes 2016–17 season.
- Overall and C-USA records are from time at current school and are through the end of the 2016–17 season.

== Preseason ==
=== Preseason Coaches Poll ===
Rank	Team
1.	UAB (10)
2.	Middle Tennessee (4)
3.	WKU
4.	Marshall
5.	Old Dominion
6.	UTEP
7.	Louisiana Tech
8.	Charlotte
9.	Rice
10.	North Texas
11.	FIU
12.	Florida Atlantic
13.	Southern Miss
14.	UTSA

() first place votes

=== Preseason All-C-USA Team ===
Recipient	School
Jeremy Combs	North Texas
Chris Cokley	UAB
Jon Elmore	Marshall
Justin Johnson	WKU
William Lee	UAB
Erik McCree	Louisiana Tech
Giddy Potts	Middle Tennessee
Ryan Taylor	Marshall
Reggie Upshaw Jr.	Middle Tennessee

== Conference schedules ==
=== Conference matrix ===
This table summarizes the head-to-head results between teams in conference play.

	Charlotte	FIU	FAU	LaTech	Marshall	MTSU	UNT	ODU	Rice	USM	UAB	UTEP	UTSA	WKU
vs. Charlotte	–	0–1	1–0	1–0	2–0	1–0	0–2	1–1	2–0	0–1	1–0	1–0	0–1	1–1
vs. FIU	1–0	–	2–0	1–0	1–0	2–0	0–1	1–0	1–0	1–0	0–2	2–0	2–0	1–0
vs. Florida Atlantic	0–1	0–2	–	1–0	1–0	2–0	1–0	0–1	1–0	0–1	2–0	2–0	1–1	1–0
vs. Louisiana Tech	0–1	0–1	0–1	–	0–1	1–0	0–2	0–1	1–1	0–2	1–0	0–2	1–1	0–1
vs. Marshall	0–2	0–1	0–1	1–0	–	2–0	0–1	1–1	1–0	1–0	1–0	1–0	0–1	0–2
vs. Middle Tennessee	0–1	0–2	0–2	0–1	0–2	–	0–1	0–1	0–1	0–1	0–2	1–0	0–1	0–2
vs. North Texas	2–0	1–0	0–1	2–0	1–0	1–0	–	2–0	2–0	2–0	1–0	1–0	1–0	1–0
vs. Old Dominion	1–1	0–1	1–0	1–0	1–1	1–0	0–2	–	0–2	0–1	1–0	0–1	1–0	0–2
vs. Rice	0–2	0–1	0–1	1–1	0–1	1–0	0–2	2–0	–	0–2	1–0	1–0	1–0	1–0
vs. Southern Miss	1–0	0–1	1–0	2–0	0–1	1–0	0–2	1–0	2–0	–	1–0	1–1	1–1	1–0
vs. UAB	1–0	2–0	0–2	0–1	1–1	2–0	0–1	1–0	0–1	0–1	–	1–0	1–0	1–1
vs. UTEP	0–1	0–2	0–2	2–0	0–1	0–1	0–1	1–0	0–1	1–1	0–1	–	1–1	1–0
vs. UTSA	0–1	0–2	1–1	1–1	1–0	1–0	1–0	0–1	1–0	1–1	0–1	1–1	–	1–0
vs. WKU	1–1	0–1	0–1	1–0	2–0	2–0	0–1	2–0	0–1	0–1	1–1	0–1	0–1	–
Total	7–11	3–15	6–12	14–4	10–8	17–1	2–16	12–6	11–7	6–12	9–9	12–6	8–10	9–9

=== Players of the Week ===
Throughout the conference regular season, the C-USA offices named one or two players of the week and one or two freshmen of the week each Monday.

Week	Player of the week	Freshman of the week
November 14, 2016	Egor Koulechov, Rice	DaQuan Bracey, Louisiana Tech
November 21, 2016	Dominic Artis, UTEP	Byron Frohnen, UTSA
November 28, 2016	JaCorey Williams, Middle Tennessee	Jailyn Ingram, Florida Atlantic
December 5, 2016	Marcus Evans, Rice	Najee Garvin, Charlotte
December 12, 2016	Jon Elmore, Marshall	Deon Barrett, UTEP
December 19, 2016	JaCorey Williams (2), Middle Tennessee	A. J. Lawson, North Texas
December 26, 2016	Stevie Browning, Marshall	Byron Frohnen (2), UTSA
December 26, 2016	Stevie Browning, Marshall	Jalen Harris, Louisiana Tech
January 2, 2017	Reggie Upshaw Jr., Middle Tennessee	Quentin Jackson Jr., Charlotte
January 9, 2017	Ryan Taylor, Marshall	Giovanni De Nicolao, UTSA
January 16, 2017	William Lee, UAB	DaQuan Bracey (2), Louisiana Tech
January 23, 2017	Jon Davis, Charlotte	DaQuan Bracey (3), Louisiana Tech
January 30, 2017	Matt Willms, UTEP	Byron Frohnen (3), UTSA
February 6, 2017	Justin Johnson, WKU	A. J. Lawson (2), North Texas
February 13, 2017	Marcus Evans (2), Rice	Ryan Woolridge, North Texas
February 20, 2017	Paul Thomas, UTEP	Ryan Woolridge (2), North Texas
February 27, 2017	Quinton Campbell, Southern Miss	A.J. Lawson (3), North Texas
March 6, 2017	Egor Koulechov (2), Rice	Jalen Harris (2), Louisiana Tech

== All-C-USA honors and awards ==
Following the regular season, the conference selected outstanding performers based on a poll of league coaches.

Honor	Recipient
Player of the Year	JaCorey Williams, Middle Tennessee
Coach of the Year	Kermit Davis, Middle Tennessee
Defensive Player of the Year	William Lee, UAB
Freshman of the Year	DaQuan Bracey, Louisiana Tech
Newcomer of the Year	JaCorey Williams, Middle Tennessee
Sixth Man of the Year	Zoran Talley, Old Dominion
All-C-USA First Team	Erik McCree, Louisiana Tech
All-C-USA First Team	Jon Elmore, Marshall
All-C-USA First Team	JaCorey Williams, Middle Tennessee
All-C-USA First Team	Marcus Evans, Rice
All-C-USA First Team	Egor Koulechov, Rice
All-C-USA Second Team	Jon Davis, Charlotte
All-C-USA Second Team	Reggie Upshaw Jr., Middle Tennessee
All-C-USA Second Team	William Lee, UAB
All-C-USA Second Team	Dominic Artis, UTEP
All-C-USA Second Team	Justin Johnson, WKU
All-C-USA Third Team	Jacobi Boykins, Louisiana Tech
All-C-USA Third Team	Ryan Taylor, Marshall
All-C-USA Third Team	Giddy Potts, Middle Tennessee
All-C-USA Third Team	Ahmad Caver, Old Dominion
All-C-USA Third Team	Omega Harris, UTEP
All-C-USA Defensive Team	Jacobi Boykins, Louisiana Tech
All-C-USA Defensive Team	Ryan Taylor, Marshall
All-C-USA Defensive Team	Reggie Upshaw Jr., Middle Tennessee
All-C-USA Defensive Team	Denzell Taylor, Old Dominion
All-C-USA Defensive Team	William Lee, UAB
All-C-USA Freshman Team	DaQuan Bracey, Louisiana Tech
All-C-USA Freshman Team	Jalen Harris, Louisiana Tech
All-C-USA Freshman Team	Tyrik Dixon, Middle Tennessee
All-C-USA Freshman Team	A. J. Lawson, North Texas
All-C-USA Freshman Team	Byron Frohnen, UTSA

== Postseason ==
=== C-USA Tournament ===
Only the top 12 conference teams were eligible for the tournament.

Game	Time*	Matchup^{#}	Score	Television	Attendance
First round – Wednesday, March 8
1	11:30 am	No. 8 Western Kentucky vs. No. 9 UTSA	52–56	Campus Insiders	3,207
2	2:00 pm	No. 5 Rice vs. No. 12 Southern Miss	86–75	Campus Insiders	3,207
3	5:30 pm	No. 7 UAB vs. No. 10 Charlotte	74–73	Campus Insiders	6,410
4	8:00 pm	No. 6 Marshall vs. No. 11 Florida Atlantic	89–74	Campus Insiders	6,410
Quarterfinals – Thursday, March 9
5	11:30 am	No. 1 Middle Tennessee vs. No. 9 UTSA	86–70	ASN	3,654
6	2:00 pm	No. 4 UTEP vs. No. 5 Rice	86–76	ASN	3,654
7	5:30 pm	No. 2 Louisiana Tech vs. No. 7 UAB	69–57	ASN	4,005
8	8:00 pm	No. 3 Old Dominion vs. No. 6 Marshall	63–64	ASN	4,005
Semifinals – Friday, March 10
9	11:30 am	No. 1 Middle Tennessee vs. No. 4 UTEP	82–56	CBSSN	3,299
10	2:00 pm	No. 2 Louisiana Tech vs. No. 6 Marshall	77–93	CBSSN	3,299
Championship Game – Saturday, March 11
11	7:30 pm	No. 1 Middle Tennessee vs. No. 6 Marshall	83–72	CBSSN	3,956
*Game times in CT. Rankings denote tournament seed

=== NCAA tournament ===
Seed	Region	School	First Four	First Round	Second Round	Sweet 16	Elite Eight	Final Four	Championship
12	South	Middle Tennessee	N/A	defeated (5) Minnesota 81–72	eliminated by (4) Butler 65–74				
