= 2017–18 Western Kentucky Hilltoppers basketball team =

American college basketball season

2017–18 Western Kentucky Hilltoppers basketball

NIT, Semifinals
- Conference: Conference USA
- Record: 27–11 (14–4 C-USA)
- Head coach: Rick Stansbury (2nd season)
- Assistant coaches: Marc Hsu; Nikita Johnson
- Home arena: E. A. Diddle Arena

2017–18 Conference USA men's basketball standings
	Conf.				Overall
Team	W		L	PCT	W		L	PCT
Middle Tennessee	16	–	2	.889	25	–	8	.758
Old Dominion	15	–	3	.833	25	–	7	.781
Western Kentucky	14	–	4	.778	27	–	11	.711
Marshall †	12	–	6	.667	25	–	11	.694
UTSA	11	–	7	.611	20	–	15	.571
UAB	10	–	8	.556	20	–	13	.606
North Texas	8	–	10	.444	20	–	18	.526
FIU	8	–	10	.444	14	–	18	.438
Southern Miss	7	–	11	.389	16	–	18	.471
Louisiana Tech	7	–	11	.389	17	–	16	.515
Florida Atlantic	6	–	12	.333	12	–	19	.387
UTEP	6	–	12	.333	11	–	20	.355
Rice	4	–	14	.222	7	–	24	.226
Charlotte	2	–	16	.111	6	–	23	.207
† 2018 C-USA Tournament winner

The 2017–18 Western Kentucky Hilltoppers men's basketball team represented Western Kentucky University during the 2017–18 NCAA Division I men's basketball season. The Hilltoppers were led by head coach Rick Stansbury in his second season and played their home games at E. A. Diddle Arena in Bowling Green, Kentucky as fourth-year members of Conference USA.

On October 16, 2017, assistant coach Ben Hansbrough resigned from WKU following his DUI arrest two days prior.

They finished the season 27–11, 14–4 in C-USA play to finish in third place. They defeated UAB and Old Dominion to advance to the championship game of the C-USA tournament where they lost to Marshall. They received an at-large bid to the National Invitation Tournament where they defeated Boston College, USC, and Oklahoma State to advance to the semifinals where they lost to Utah.

== Previous season ==
The Hilltoppers finished the 2016–17 season with 15–17, 9–9 in C-USA play to finish in a tie for seventh place. They lost to UTSA in the first round of the C-USA tournament.

== Offseason ==
=== Departures ===
Name	Number	Pos.	Height	Weight	Year	Hometown	Notes
Jabari McGhee	00	F	6'7"	205	RS Sophomore	Albany, Georgia	Left for the team for personal reasons
Tobias Howard	1	G	6'2"	182	Freshman	Lithonia, GA	Transferred to Chipola College
Damari Parris	3	G	6'0"	160	Sophomore	Bowie, MD	Transferred to Trinity Valley CC
Junior Lomomba	5	G	6'5"	205	RS Senior	Montreal, QE	Graduated
Cleveland Thomas	12	G	6'4"	195	RS Senior	Baton Rouge, LA	Graduated
Benjamin Lawson	14	F/C	7'1"	235	Senior	Hitchin, England	Graduated
Marko Stajkovski	21	G	6'7"	195	Freshman	Novi Sad, Serbia	Transferred to Mineral Area College
Willie Carmichael	24	F	6'8"	210	RS Sophomore	Apopka, FL	Dismissed from the team
Que Johnson	32	G	6'6"	205	RS Senior	Pontiac, MI	Graduated
Anton Waters	42	F	6'7"	245	Senior	Baltimore, MD	Graduated
Marty Leahy	43	G	6'5"	210	Freshman	Brisbane, Australia	Left for the team for personal reasons

=== Incoming transfers ===
Name	Number	Pos.	Height	Weight	Year	Hometown	Previous School
Darius Thompson	15	G	6'4"	196	Graduate Student	Murfreesboro, Tennessee	Transferred from Virginia. Thompson will play in the 2017–18 season.
Dwight Coleby	22	F	6'9"	240	Graduate Student	Nassau, Bahamas	Transferred from Kansas. Coleby will play in the 2017–18 season.
Jared Savage	2	G/F	6'5"	190	Junior	Bowling Green, Kentucky	Transferred from Austin Peay. Will sit out the 2017–18 season due to NCAA transfer rules.

=== 2017 recruiting class ===
Mitchell Robinson, a McDonald's All-American and a projected first-round pick in the 2018 NBA draft, committed to Western Kentucky a few weeks after the school hired his godfather, Shammond Williams. He signed a National Letter of Intent in November 2016 and enrolled at the school in July 2017. However, later in July, he left the school amid reports that he was unhappy at the school. Head coach Rick Stansbury and the school issued a statement that Robinson was suspended and would not be going on the team's trip to Costa Rica in August. However, asking to be released from his Letter of Intent and being released, he made visits to LSU, Kansas, and New Orleans. At the end of August, he returned to the school and enrolled and stated that he intends to play for Western Kentucky. On September 17, Robinson again left the university announcing he will prepare for the NBA and will not play college basketball.

College recruiting
Name	Hometown	School	Height	Weight	Commit date
Josh Anderson; F	Baton Rouge, Louisiana	Madison Prep Academy	6 ft 5 in (1.96 m)	180 lb (82 kg)	Sep 20, 2016
Josh Anderson; F	Recruit ratings: Scout: Rivals: 247Sports: ESPN: (84)				
Taveion Hollingsworth; G	Lexington, Kentucky	Paul Laurence Dunbar HS	6 ft 2 in (1.88 m)	170 lb (77 kg)	Nov 9, 2016
Taveion Hollingsworth; G	Recruit ratings: Scout: Rivals: 247Sports: ESPN: (NR)				
Jake Ohmer; G	Covington, Kentucky	Scott HS	5 ft 10 in (1.78 m)	150 lb (68 kg)	Mar 20, 2017
Jake Ohmer; G	Recruit ratings: Scout: Rivals: 247Sports: ESPN: (NR)				
Marek Nelson; F	Plano, Texas	Sunrise Christian Academy (KS)	6 ft 7 in (2.01 m)	180 lb (82 kg)	May 14, 2017
Marek Nelson; F	Recruit ratings: Scout: Rivals: 247Sports: ESPN: (NR)				
Overall recruit ranking:
Note: In many cases, Scout, Rivals, 247Sports, On3, and ESPN may conflict in their listings of height and weight.; In these cases, the average was taken. ESPN grades are on a 100-point scale.; Sources: "2017 Team Ranking". Rivals.

=== Costa Rica trip ===
The Hilltoppers announced that they would be participating in a seven-day, three-game foreign tour to Costa Rica in August.

== Roster ==
2017–18 WKU Hilltoppers men's basketball team
Players
Coaches

Pos.	#	Name	Height	Weight	Year	Previous school	Hometown
G	0	Tyler Miller	6 ft 4 in (1.93 m)	190 lb (86 kg)	Sr	22ft Academy	Louisville, Kentucky
G	1	Lamonte Bearden	6 ft 3 in (1.91 m)	170 lb (77 kg)	RS Jr	Buffalo	Milwaukee, Wisconsin
G/F	2	Jared Savage (redshirt)	6 ft 5 in (1.96 m)	195 lb (88 kg)	Jr	Austin Peay	Bowling Green, Kentucky
F	4	Josh Anderson	6 ft 6 in (1.98 m)	180 lb (82 kg)	Fr	Madison Prep Academy	Baton Rouge, Louisiana
F	12	Moustapha Diagne	6 ft 9 in (2.06 m)	230 lb (104 kg)	RS So	Northwest Florida State College	Rufisque, Senegal
G	13	Taveion Hollingsworth	6 ft 2 in (1.88 m)	165 lb (75 kg)	Fr	Paul Laurence Dunbar HS	Lexington, Kentucky
F	14	Marek Nelson	6 ft 7 in (2.01 m)	185 lb (84 kg)	Fr	Sunrise Christian Academy (KS)	Plano, Texas
G	15	Darius Thompson	6 ft 4 in (1.93 m)	190 lb (86 kg)	RS Sr	Virginia	Murfreesboro, Tennessee
G	21	Jake Ohmer	6 ft 1 in (1.85 m)	170 lb (77 kg)	Fr	Scott HS	Covington, Kentucky
F	22	Dwight Coleby	6 ft 9 in (2.06 m)	245 lb (111 kg)	RS Sr	Kansas	Nassau, Bahamas
F	23	Justin Johnson	6 ft 7 in (2.01 m)	245 lb (111 kg)	Sr	Perry County Central High School	Hazard, Kentucky

Head coach

- Rick Stansbury (Campbellsville)

Assistant coach(es)

- Marc Hsu (Cabrini)
- Nikita Johnson (West Georgia)

Legend

- (C) Team captain
- (S) Suspended
- (I) Ineligible
- (W) Walk-on
- Injured
- Current redshirt

Roster

== Schedule and results ==
Date time, TV	Rank^{#}	Opponent^{#}	Result	Record	Site (attendance) city, state
Costa Rica trip
Aug 8, 2017*		Laurentian University	W 104–98		BN Arena; San Jose, Costa Rica
Aug 9, 2017*; 9:00 pm		Costa Rica National Team	W 99–69		BN Arena; San Jose, Costa Rica
Aug 10, 2017*; 5:00 pm		Laurentian University	W 118–63		BN Arena; San Jose, Costa Rica
Exhibition
Oct 29, 2017*; 1:00 pm		at Samford; Pack The Pete For Hurricane Relief	W 78–64		Pete Hanna Center (608); Homewood, AL
Nov 1, 2017*; 7:00 pm		Campbellsville	W 92–51		E.A. Diddle Arena (2,789); Bowling Green, KY
Nov 7, 2017*; 7:00 pm, WKYU		Cumberland	W 109–66		E.A. Diddle Arena (3,081); Bowling Green, KY
Non-conference regular season
Nov 10, 2017*; 7:00 pm, WKYU		Missouri State	L 80–85	0–1	E.A. Diddle Arena (5,241); Bowling Green, KY
Nov 15, 2017*; 7:00 pm, FCS/WKYU		Kentucky Wesleyan	W 83–53	1–1	E.A. Diddle Arena (3,844); Bowling Green, KY
Nov 19, 2017*; 5:00 pm, FCS/WKYU		Nicholls State; Battle 4 Atlantis On Campus Site	W 100–86	2–1	E.A. Diddle Arena (3,378); Bowling Green, KY
Nov 22, 2017*; 1:30 pm, ESPN2		vs. No. 5 Villanova; Battle 4 Atlantis Quarterfinals	L 58–66	2–2	Imperial Arena (3,378); Nassau, Bahamas
Nov 23, 2017*; 6:00 pm, ESPN3		vs. No. 18 Purdue; Battle 4 Atlantis	W 77–73	3–2	Imperial Arena (2,102); Nassau, Bahamas
Nov 24, 2017*; 6:00 pm, ESPN3		vs. SMU; Battle 4 Atlantis 5th place game	W 63–61	4–2	Imperial Arena (1,252); Nassau, Bahamas
Nov 29, 2017*; 7:00 pm, Stadium		Eastern Kentucky	W 83–51	5–2	E.A. Diddle Arena (5,532); Bowling Green, KY
Dec 2, 2017*; 4:00 pm, FCS/WKYU		Wright State	W 78–60	6–2	E.A. Diddle Arena (4,165); Bowling Green, KY
Dec 10, 2017*; 1:00 pm, ESPN3		at Ohio	L 84–89	6–3	Convocation Center (4,501); Athens, OH
Dec 13, 2017*; 7:00 pm, FS1		at Wisconsin	L 80–81	6–4	Kohl Center (17,287); Madison, WI
Dec 16, 2017*; 2:00 pm, FCS/WKYU		Indiana State	W 81–65	7–4	E.A. Diddle Arena (4,412); Bowling Green, KY
Dec 19, 2017*; 7:00 pm, FCS/WKYU		Belmont	L 72–75	7–5	E.A. Diddle Arena (5,156); Bowling Green, KY
Dec 22, 2017*; 7:00 pm		at Austin Peay	W 72–55	8–5	Dunn Center (2,023); Clarksville, TN
Conference USA regular season
Dec 28, 2017; 7:00 pm, beIN Sports		Louisiana Tech	W 69–68	9–5 (1–0)	E.A. Diddle Arena (4,897); Bowling Green, KY
Dec 30, 2017; 2:00 pm, FCS/WKYU		Southern Miss	W 82–66	10–5 (2–0)	E.A. Diddle Arena (4,654); Bowling Green, KY
Jan 6, 2018; 6:00 pm, Stadium		at Marshall	W 112–87	11–5 (3–0)	Cam Henderson Center (6,826); Huntington, WV
Jan 11, 2018; 7:00 pm, beIN Sports		at Old Dominion	W 75–68	12–5 (4–0)	Ted Constant Convocation Center (6,895); Norfolk, VA
Jan 13, 2018; 6:00 pm, FCS/WKYU		at Charlotte	W 73–63	13–5 (5–0)	Dale F. Halton Arena (3,845); Charlotte, NC
Jan 18, 2018; 8:00 pm, CBSSN		UAB	W 77–69	14–5 (6–0)	E.A. Diddle Arena (5,643); Bowling Green, KY
Jan 20, 2018; 6:00 pm, Stadium		Middle Tennessee	L 62–66	14–6 (6–1)	E.A. Diddle Arena (7,759); Bowling Green, KY
Jan 27, 2018; 6:00 pm, Stadium		Marshall	W 85–74	15–6 (7–1)	E.A. Diddle Arena (7,362); Bowling Green, KY
Feb 1, 2018; 9:00 pm, CBSSN		at UTEP	W 72–60	16–6 (8–1)	Don Haskins Center (6,116); El Paso, TX
Feb 3, 2018; 3:00 pm, FCS/WKYU		at UTSA	L 63–74	16–7 (8–2)	Convocation Center (1,305); San Antonio, TX
Feb 8, 2018; 7:30 pm, FCS/WKYU		Florida Atlantic	W 75–63	17–7 (9–2)	E.A. Diddle Arena (5,617); Bowling Green, KY
Feb 10, 2018; 6:00 pm, FCS/WKYU		FIU	W 83–76	18–7 (10–2)	E.A. Diddle Arena (6,429); Bowling Green, KY
Feb 15, 2018; 8:00 pm, beIN Sports		at North Texas	W 102–94 ^{OT}	19–7 (11–2)	The Super Pit (2,306); Denton, TX
Feb 17, 2018; 7:00 pm, ESPN3		at Rice	W 85–66	20–7 (12–2)	Tudor Fieldhouse (4,246); Houston, TX
Feb 22, 2018; 7:00 pm, beIN Sports		Charlotte	W 93–55	21–7 (13–2)	E.A. Diddle Arena (5,634); Bowling Green, KY
Feb 24, 2018; 6:00 pm, Stadium		Old Dominion	W 88–66	22–7 (14–2)	E.A. Diddle Arena (7,387); Bowling Green, KY
Mar 1, 2018; 7:00 pm, CBSSN		at Middle Tennessee	L 64–82	22–8 (14–3)	Murphy Center (11,307); Murfreesboro, TN
Mar 3, 2018; 7:00 pm, FCS/WKYU		at UAB	L 73–101	22–9 (14–4)	Bartow Arena (4,363); Birmingham, AL
Conference USA Tournament
Mar 8, 2018; 9:00 pm, Stadium	(3)	vs. (6) UAB; Quarterfinals	W 98–70	23–9	The Ford Center at The Star; Frisco, TX
Mar 9, 2018; 3:00 pm, CBSSN	(3)	vs. (2) Old Dominion; Semifinals	W 57–49	24–9	The Ford Center at The Star; Frisco, TX
Mar 10, 2018; 7:30 pm, CBSSN	(3)	vs. (4) Marshall; Championship	L 66–67	24–10	The Ford Center at The Star; Frisco, TX
NIT
Mar 13, 2018*; 7:00 pm, ESPN3	(4)	(5) Boston College; First Round – USC Bracket	W 79–62	25–10	E.A. Diddle Arena (6,176); Bowling Green, KY
Mar 19, 2018*; 10:30 pm, ESPN2	(4)	at (1) USC; Second Round – USC Bracket	W 79–75	26–10	Galen Center (2,130); Los Angeles, CA
Mar 21, 2018*; 7:00 pm, ESPN	(4)	at (2) Oklahoma State; Quarterfinals – USC Bracket	W 92–84	27–10	Gallagher-Iba Arena (11,308); Stillwater, OK
Mar 27, 2018*; 6:00 pm, ESPN	(4)	vs. (2) Utah; Semifinals	L 64–69	27–11	Madison Square Garden (7,865); New York City, NY
*Non-conference game. ^{#}Rankings from AP Poll. (#) Tournament seedings in parentheses. All times are in Central Time Source.

== See also ==
2017–18 WKU Lady Toppers basketball team
