= 2017–18 Furman Paladins men's basketball team =

American college basketball season

2017–18 Furman Paladins men's basketball
- Conference: Southern Conference
- Record: 23–10 (13–5 SoCon)
- Head coach: Bob Richey (1st season)
- Assistant coaches: Tyler Murray; Dwight Perry; Trey Meyer
- Home arena: Timmons Arena

2017–18 Southern Conference men's basketball standings
	Conf.				Overall
Team	W		L	PCT	W		L	PCT
UNC Greensboro †	15	–	3	.833	27	–	8	.771
East Tennessee State	14	–	4	.778	25	–	9	.735
Furman	13	–	5	.722	23	–	10	.697
Mercer	11	–	7	.611	19	–	15	.559
Wofford	11	–	7	.611	21	–	13	.618
Western Carolina	8	–	10	.444	13	–	19	.406
Samford	6	–	12	.333	10	–	22	.313
The Citadel	5	–	13	.278	11	–	21	.344
VMI	4	–	14	.222	9	–	21	.300
Chattanooga	3	–	15	.167	10	–	23	.303
† 2018 SoCon Tournament winner

The 2017–18 Furman Paladins men's basketball team represented Furman University during the 2017–18 NCAA Division I men's basketball season. The Paladins, led by first-year head coach Bob Richey, played their home games at Timmons Arena in Greenville, South Carolina as members of the Southern Conference. They finished the season 23–10, 13–5 in SoCon play to finish in third place. They defeated Western Carolina in the quarterfinals of the SoCon tournament before losing in the semifinals to East Tennessee State. Despite having 23 wins, they did not participate in a postseason tournament.

== Previous season ==
The Paladins finished the 2016–17 season 23–12, 14–4 in SoCon play to finish in a three-way tie for the SoCon regular season championship. They lost to Samford in the quarterfinals SoCon tournament. They were invited to the CollegeInsider.com Tournament where they defeated USC Upstate and Campbell before losing in the semifinals to Saint Peter's.

On March 26, 2017, head coach Niko Medved resigned to become the head coach at Drake. He finished at Furman with a four-year record of 62–70. Assistant coach Bob Richey was named the interim head coach for the CIT semifinal, and was named full-time head coach on April 10.

== Roster ==
2017–18 Furman Paladins men's basketball team
Players
Coaches

Pos.	#	Name	Height	Weight	Year	Hometown
G	0	Tre Clark	6 ft 5 in (1.96 m)	194 lb (88 kg)	So	Palmetto, Florida
G	1	John Davis III	5 ft 11 in (1.8 m)	172 lb (78 kg)	Sr	Beachwood, Ohio
F	2	Jalen Williams	6 ft 8 in (2.03 m)	240 lb (109 kg)	RS So	Greenville, South Carolina
F	3	Geoff Beans	6 ft 7 in (2.01 m)	210 lb (95 kg)	Sr	Toledo, Ohio
F	4	Noah Gurley	6 ft 8 in (2.03 m)	190 lb (86 kg)	Fr	Fayetteville, Georgia
G	5	Andrew Brown	6 ft 5 in (1.96 m)	212 lb (96 kg)	Jr	Travelers Rest, South Carolina
G	10	Alex Hunter	5 ft 11 in (1.8 m)	170 lb (77 kg)	Fr	Raleigh, North Carolina
G	11	Jonathan Jean	5 ft 11 in (1.8 m)	170 lb (77 kg)	Jr	Tampa, Florida
G	12	Devin Sibley	6 ft 2 in (1.88 m)	175 lb (79 kg)	Sr	Knoxville, Tennessee
G	13	Brady Schuck	6 ft 2 in (1.88 m)	165 lb (75 kg)	Jr	Charleston, South Carolina
F	21	Seve Stavroff	5 ft 11 in (1.8 m)	165 lb (75 kg)	Fr	Dublin, Ohio
G	23	Jordan Lyons	5 ft 11 in (1.8 m)	203 lb (92 kg)	So	Peachtree City, Georgia
F	32	Matt Rafferty	6 ft 8 in (2.03 m)	215 lb (98 kg)	Jr	Hinsdale, Illinois
G	35	Daniel Fowler	6 ft 4 in (1.93 m)	203 lb (92 kg)	Sr	Acworth, Georgia
F	45	Clay Mounce	6 ft 7 in (2.01 m)	200 lb (91 kg)	RS Fr	Elkin, North Carolina

Head coach

- Bob Richey (North Greenville)

Assistant coach(es)

- Tyler Murray (Hampden–Sydney)
- Dwight Perry (Kentucky)
- Trey Meyer (Clemson)

Legend

- (C) Team captain
- (S) Suspended
- (I) Ineligible
- (W) Walk-on
- Injured
- Current redshirt

Roster
Last update: January 4, 2018

== Schedule and results ==
Date time, TV	Rank^{#}	Opponent^{#}	Result	Record	Site (attendance) city, state
Non-conference regular season
Nov 10, 2017*; 7:00 pm		Bob Jones	W 101–48	1–0	Timmons Arena (1,688); Greenville, SC
Nov 14, 2017*; 7:00 pm, ESPN3		Elon	W 76–67	2–0	Timmons Arena (1,531); Greenville, SC
Nov 18, 2017*; 2:00 pm, FS2		at Butler; Phil Knight Invitational	L 65–82	2–1	Hinkle Fieldhouse (7,827); Indianapolis, IN
Nov 20, 2017*; 7:00 pm, ACCN Extra		at No. 1 Duke; Phil Knight Invitational	L 63–92	2–2	Cameron Indoor Stadium (9,314); Durham, NC
Nov 24, 2017*; 1:00 pm		vs. New Hampshire; Phil Knight Invitational sub-regional	W 78–64	3–2	Nashville Municipal Auditorium (400); Nashville, TN
Nov 25, 2017*; 2:30 pm		vs. Northeastern; Phil Knight Invitational sub-regional	W 78–67	4–2	Nashville Municipal Auditorium (400); Nashville, TN
Nov 29, 2017*; 7:00 pm, ESPN3		Winthrop	L 74–93	4–3	Timmons Arena (1,351); Greenville, SC
Dec 2, 2017*; 4:00 pm, ESPN3		Tennessee Tech	W 64–50	5–3	Timmons Arena (1,002); Greenville, SC
Dec 5, 2017*; 7:00 pm, ESPN3		UNC Asheville	W 83–72	6–3	Timmons Arena (1,002); Greenville, SC
Dec 9, 2017*; 7:00 pm, ESPN3		South Carolina State	W 101–72	7–3	Timmons Arena (1,325); Greenville, SC
Dec 14, 2017*; 7:00 pm, ESPN3		Montreat	W 103–47	8–3	Timmons Arena (1,325); Greenville, SC
Dec 17, 2017*; 7:00 pm		at UNC Wilmington	W 90–84	9–3	Trask Coliseum (4,236); Wilmington, NC
Dec 20, 2017*; 9:00 pm, SECN		at No. 21 Tennessee	L 61–66	9–4	Thompson–Boling Arena (13,095); Knoxville, TN
SoCon regular season
Dec 30, 2017; 1:00 pm, ESPN3		at VMI	W 87–57	10–4 (1–0)	Cameron Hall (637); Lexington, VA
Jan 4, 2018; 7:30 pm, ESPN3		The Citadel	W 107–67	11–4 (2–0)	Timmons Arena (1,509); Greenville, SC
Jan 6, 2018; 4:30 pm, ESPN3		Mercer	W 74–71	12–4 (3–0)	Timmons Arena (2,002); Greenville, SC
Jan 10, 2018; 7:00 pm		at Chattanooga	W 73–55	13–4 (4–0)	McKenzie Arena (2,471); Chattanooga, TN
Jan 13, 2018; 7:00 pm, ESPN3		at Wofford	L 70–79	13–5 (4–1)	Jerry Richardson Indoor Stadium (3,400); Spartanburg, SC
Jan 18, 2018; 7:00 pm, ESPN3		East Tennessee State	L 61–62	13–6 (4–2)	Timmons Arena (1,806); Greenville, SC
Jan 20, 2018; 4:30 pm, ESPN3		Samford	W 78–67	14–6 (5–2)	Timmons Arena (2,211); Greenville, SC
Jan 24, 2018; 7:00 pm, ESPN3		at UNC Greensboro	L 61–71	14–7 (5–3)	Greensboro Coliseum (2,604); Greensboro, NC
Jan 27, 2018; 4:00 pm, ESPN3		Western Carolina	W 100–66	15–7 (6–3)	Timmons Arena (1,812); Greenville, SC
Feb 1, 2018; 7:00 pm, ESPN3		at Mercer	W 85–73	16–7 (7–3)	Hawkins Arena (2,772); Macon, GA
Feb 3, 2018; 1:00 pm, ESPN3		at The Citadel	L 92–100 ^{OT}	16–8 (7–4)	McAlister Field House (983); Charleston, SC
Feb 7, 2018; 7:00 pm, ESPN3		UNC Greensboro	L 67–80	16–9 (7–5)	Timmons Arena (1,560); Greenville, SC
Feb 10, 2018; 4:30 pm, ESPN3		Wofford	W 76–52	17–9 (8–5)	Timmons Arena (2,552); Greenville, SC
Feb 15, 2018; 7:00 pm, ESPN3		Chattanooga	W 75–56	18–9 (9–5)	Timmons Arena (1,511); Greenville, SC
Feb 17, 2018; 2:00 pm, ESPN3		at Samford	W 94–79	19–9 (10–5)	Pete Hanna Center (1,990); Homewood, AL
Feb 20, 2018; 7:00 pm, ESPN3		VMI	W 76–54	20–9 (11–5)	Timmons Arena (1,403); Greenville, SC
Feb 23, 2018; 7:00 pm		at Western Carolina	W 78–55	21–9 (12–5)	Ramsey Center (1,386); Cullowhee, NC
Feb 25, 2018; 2:00 pm, ESPN3		at East Tennessee State	W 79–76	22–9 (13–5)	Freedom Hall Civic Center (5,908); Johnson City, TN
SoCon tournament
Mar 3, 2018; 6:00 pm, ESPN3	(3)	vs. (6) Western Carolina; Quarterfinals	W 97–73	23–9	U.S. Cellular Center (5,431); Asheville, NC
Mar 4, 2018; 6:30 pm, ESPN3	(3)	vs. (2) East Tennessee State; Semifinals	L 52–63	23–10	U.S. Cellular Center (5,546); Asheville, NC
*Non-conference game. ^{#}Rankings from AP Poll. (#) Tournament seedings in parentheses. All times are in Eastern Time.
