= 2017–18 Chattanooga Mocs men's basketball team =

American college basketball season

2017–18 Chattanooga Mocs men's basketball
- Conference: Southern Conference
- Record: 10–23 (3–15 SoCon)
- Head coach: Lamont Paris (1st season)
- Assistant coaches: Aaron Fuss; Tanner Bronson; Walter Offutt
- Home arena: McKenzie Arena

2017–18 Southern Conference men's basketball standings
	Conf.				Overall
Team	W		L	PCT	W		L	PCT
UNC Greensboro †	15	–	3	.833	27	–	8	.771
East Tennessee State	14	–	4	.778	25	–	9	.735
Furman	13	–	5	.722	23	–	10	.697
Mercer	11	–	7	.611	19	–	15	.559
Wofford	11	–	7	.611	21	–	13	.618
Western Carolina	8	–	10	.444	13	–	19	.406
Samford	6	–	12	.333	10	–	22	.313
The Citadel	5	–	13	.278	11	–	21	.344
VMI	4	–	14	.222	9	–	21	.300
Chattanooga	3	–	15	.167	10	–	23	.303
† 2018 SoCon Tournament winner

The 2017–18 Chattanooga Mocs basketball team represented the University of Tennessee at Chattanooga during the 2017–18 NCAA Division I men's basketball season. The Mocs, led by first-year head coach Lamont Paris, played their home games at McKenzie Arena and as members of the Southern Conference. They finished the season 10–23, 3–15 in SoCon play to finish in last place. They defeated Samford in the first round of the SoCon tournament to advance to the quarterfinals where they lost to East Tennessee State.

== Previous season ==
The Mocs finished the 2016–17 season 19–12, 10–8 in SoCon play to finish for fourth place. In the SoCon tournament, they lost to Wofford in the quarterfinals.

On March 29, 2017, head coach Matt McCall left the program to take the head coaching job at UMass. On April 3, the Mocs hired Wisconsin assistant Lamont Paris as the new head coach.

== Roster ==
2017–18 Chattanooga Mocs men's basketball team
Players
Coaches

Pos.	#	Name	Height	Weight	Year	Hometown
G	0	Makale Forman	6 ft 1 in (1.85 m)	185 lb (84 kg)	So	Kingsport, Tennessee
G	1	Rodney Chatman	6 ft 1 in (1.85 m)	175 lb (79 kg)	So	Lithonia, Georgia
G	2	Jerry Johnson, Jr.	6 ft 1 in (1.85 m)	220 lb (100 kg)	Jr	Memphis, Tennessee
C	2	Joshua Phillips	6 ft 8 in (2.03 m)	245 lb (111 kg)	Sr	Hendersonville, Tennessee
G/F	3	David Jean-Baptiste	6 ft 1 in (1.85 m)	190 lb (86 kg)	RS Fr	Miami, Florida
F	4	Nick DesMarais	6 ft 4 in (1.93 m)	193 lb (88 kg)	Fr	White House, Tennessee
G/F	5	Nat Dixon	6 ft 4 in (1.93 m)	180 lb (82 kg)	Jr	Panama City, Florida
F	10	James Lewis, Jr.	6 ft 6 in (1.98 m)	215 lb (98 kg)	Fr	Mount Holly, North Carolina
G	12	Dylan Brewster	6 ft 2 in (1.88 m)	185 lb (84 kg)	Jr	Lenoir City, Tennessee
F	13	A.J. Bowers	6 ft 5 in (1.96 m)	184 lb (83 kg)	Fr	Nashville, Tennessee
F	21	Duane Moss	6 ft 6 in (1.98 m)	190 lb (86 kg)	RS Fr	Myrtle Beach, South Carolina
F	22	Makinde London	6 ft 10 in (2.08 m)	220 lb (100 kg)	RS Jr	Nashville, Tennessee
G	24	C.J. Massengill	6 ft 1 in (1.85 m)	175 lb (79 kg)	Fr	Chattanooga, Tennessee
F	25	Justin Brown	6 ft 10 in (2.08 m)	200 lb (91 kg)	Fr	Chicago, Illinois
G	33	Jonathan Bryant II	6 ft 3 in (1.91 m)	210 lb (95 kg)	Fr	Orange Park, Florida

Head coach

- Lamont Paris (Wooster)

Assistant coach(es)

- Aaron Fuss (Ohio State)
- Tanner Bronson (Wisconsin)
- Walter Offutt (Ohio)

Legend

- (C) Team captain
- (S) Suspended
- (I) Ineligible
- (W) Walk-on
- Injured
- Current redshirt

Roster
Last update: November 30, 2017

== Schedule and results ==
Date time, TV	Rank^{#}	Opponent^{#}	Result	Record	Site (attendance) city, state
Non-conference regular season
Nov 10, 2017*; 9:00 pm		at Wyoming; Cayman Islands Classic	L 65–74	0–1	Arena-Auditorium (5,056); Laramie, WY
Nov 13, 2017*; 8:00 pm		at UAB; Cayman Islands Classic	L 47–89	0–2	Bartow Arena (2,985); Birmingham, AL
Nov 16, 2017*; 7:00 pm, ESPN3		Hiwassee	W 94–46	1–2	McKenzie Arena (2,370); Chattanooga, TN
Nov 20, 2017*; 5:00 pm, ESPN3		Alabama State; Cayman Islands Classic mainland semifinals	W 67–50	2–2	McKenzie Arena (2,332); Chattanooga, TN
Nov 21, 2017*; 7:30 pm, ESPN3		Jacksonville State; Cayman Islands Classic mainland finals	L 75–77 ^{OT}	2–3	McKenzie Arena (2,211); Chattanooga, TN
Nov 25, 2017*; 7:00 pm, ESPN3		Tennessee Wesleyan	W 95–60	3–3	McKenzie Arena (2,305); Chattanooga, TN
Nov 28, 2017*; 7:00 pm, ESPN3		at Akron	L 70–75	3–4	James A. Rhodes Arena (2,305); Akron, OH
Dec 2, 2017*; 5:00 pm, ESPN3		UT Martin	W 66–63	4–4	McKenzie Arena (3,676); Chattanooga, TN
Dec 5, 2017*; 7:00 pm		at Marshall	L 66–70	4–5	Cam Henderson Center (4,811); Huntington, WV
Dec 10, 2017*; 1:00 pm, ESPN3		Charlotte	W 64–50	5–5	McKenzie Arena (3,676); Chattanooga, TN
Dec 17, 2017*; 2:00 pm		at Tennessee Tech	L 76–82	5–6	Eblen Center (1,039); Cookeville, TN
Dec 21, 2017*; 1:00 pm		at Jacksonville State	W 70–67	6–6	Pete Mathews Coliseum (1,002); Jacksonville, AL
Dec 23, 2017*; 1:00 pm, ESPN3		Georgia State	L 48–71	6–7	McKenzie Arena (2,108); Chattanooga, TN
SoCon regular season
Dec 30, 2017; 8:00 pm		at Samford	L 56–73	6–8 (0–1)	Pete Hanna Center (1,067); Homewood, AL
Jan 4, 2018; 7:30 pm, ESPN3		Western Carolina	L 63–75	6–9 (0–2)	McKenzie Arena (3,844); Chattanooga, TN
Jan 6, 2018; 5:00 pm, ESPN3		East Tennessee State	L 66–85	6–10 (0–3)	McKenzie Arena (4,444); Chattanooga, TN
Jan 10, 2018; 7:00 pm, ESPN3		Furman	L 55–73	6–11 (0–4)	McKenzie Arena (2,471); Chattanooga, TN
Jan 13, 2017; 1:00 pm		at The Citadel	L 101–110 ^{OT}	6–12 (0–5)	McAlister Field House (573); Charleston, SC
Jan 15, 2017; 7:00 pm		at Mercer	L 71–75 ^{OT}	6–13 (0–6)	Hawkins Arena (3,476); Macon, GA
Jan 20, 2017; 7:00 pm		at Wofford	L 67–71	6–14 (0–7)	Jerry Richardson Indoor Stadium (2,983); Spartanburg, SC
Jan 24, 2018; 7:00 pm, ESPN3		Samford	W 78–71	7–14 (1–7)	McKenzie Arena (3,069); Chattanooga, TN
Jan 27, 2018; 5:00 pm, ESPN3		VMI	L 69–70	7–15 (1–8)	McKenzie Arena (4,778); Chattanooga, TN
Jan 29, 2018; 7:00 pm, ESPN3		UNC Greensboro	W 87–85 ^{2OT}	8–15 (2–8)	McKenzie Arena (2,503); Chattanooga, TN
Feb 1, 2017; 7:30 pm		at Western Carolina	L 68–70	8–16 (2–9)	Ramsey Center (1,109); Cullowhee, NC
Feb 3, 2017; 4:00 pm		at East Tennessee State	L 61–81	8–17 (2–10)	Freedom Hall Civic Center (6,149); Johnson City, TN
Feb 8, 2018; 7:00 pm, ESPN3		The Citadel	W 85–82	9–17 (3–10)	McKenzie Arena (2,409); Chattanooga, TN
Feb 10, 2018; 5:00 pm, ESPN3		Mercer	L 75–84	9–18 (3–11)	McKenzie Arena (4,380); Chattanooga, TN
Feb 15, 2017; 7:00 pm		at Furman	L 56–75	9–19 (3–12)	Timmons Arena (1,511); Greenville, SC
Feb 17, 2018; 5:00 pm, ESPN3		Wofford	L 64–74	9–20 (3–13)	McKenzie Arena (4,235); Chattanooga, TN
Feb 23, 2017; 7:00 pm		at UNC Greensboro	L 51–72	9–21 (3–14)	Greensboro Coliseum (5,062); Greensboro, NC
Feb 25, 2017; 1:00 pm, ESPN3		at VMI	L 65–68	9–22 (3–15)	Cameron Hall (1,147); Lexington, VA
SoCon tournament
Mar 2, 2018; 7:30 pm, ESPN3	(10)	vs. (7) Samford; First round	W 89–79	10–22	U.S. Cellular Center (2,138); Asheville, NC
Mar 3, 2018; 8:30 pm, ESPN3	(10)	vs. (2) East Tennessee State; Quarterfinals	L 59–77	10–23	U.S. Cellular Center (5,431); Asheville, NC
*Non-conference game. ^{#}Rankings from AP Poll. (#) Tournament seedings in parentheses. All times are in Eastern Time Source.

== See also ==
- 2017-18 Chattanooga Mocs women's basketball
