= 2017–18 Wofford Terriers men's basketball team =

American college basketball season

2017–18 Wofford Terriers men's basketball

CIT, Second round
- Conference: Southern Conference
- Record: 21–13 (11–7 SoCon)
- Head coach: Mike Young (16th season)
- Assistant coaches: Jay McAuley; Kevin Giltner; Will Murphy
- Home arena: Jerry Richardson Indoor Stadium

2017–18 Southern Conference men's basketball standings
	Conf.				Overall
Team	W		L	PCT	W		L	PCT
UNC Greensboro †	15	–	3	.833	27	–	8	.771
East Tennessee State	14	–	4	.778	25	–	9	.735
Furman	13	–	5	.722	23	–	10	.697
Mercer	11	–	7	.611	19	–	15	.559
Wofford	11	–	7	.611	21	–	13	.618
Western Carolina	8	–	10	.444	13	–	19	.406
Samford	6	–	12	.333	10	–	22	.313
The Citadel	5	–	13	.278	11	–	21	.344
VMI	4	–	14	.222	9	–	21	.300
Chattanooga	3	–	15	.167	10	–	23	.303
† 2018 SoCon Tournament winner

The 2017–18 Wofford Terriers men's basketball team represented Wofford College during the 2017–18 NCAA Division I men's basketball season. The Terriers, led by 16th-year head coach Mike Young, played their home games at the newly opened Jerry Richardson Indoor Stadium in Spartanburg, South Carolina as members of the Southern Conference. They finished the season 21–13, 11–7 in SoCon play to finish in a tie for fourth place. They defeated Mercer in the quarterfinals of the SoCon tournament to advance to the semifinals where they lost to UNC Greensboro. They were invited to the CollegeInsider.com Tournament where, after a first round bye, they lost in the second round to Central Michigan.

== Previous season ==
The Terriers finished the 2016–17 season 16–17, 10–8 in SoCon play to finish in a tie for fourth place. They defeated Chattanooga in the quarterfinals of the SoCon tournament to advance to the semifinals where they lost to UNC Greensboro.

== Roster ==
2017–18 Wofford Terriers men's basketball team
Players
Coaches

Pos.	#	Name	Height	Weight	Year	Previous school	Hometown
F	0	Chevez Goodwin (redshirt)	6 ft 9 in (2.06 m)	210 lb (95 kg)	So	Hammond School/College of Charleston	Blythewood, SC
G	1	Derrick Brooks	6 ft 3 in (1.91 m)	205 lb (93 kg)	Sr	Bartow H.S.	Hinesville, GA
F/C	2	Michael Manning Jr.	6 ft 9 in (2.06 m)	200 lb (91 kg)	Fr	Lausanne Collegiate School	Memphis, TN
G	3	Fletcher Magee	6 ft 4 in (1.93 m)	193 lb (88 kg)	Jr	The First Academy	Orlando, FL
G	5	Storm Murphy	5 ft 11 in (1.8 m)	180 lb (82 kg)	Fr	Middleton H.S.	Middleton, WI
G	10	Nathan Hoover	6 ft 4 in (1.93 m)	180 lb (82 kg)	So	Arlington H.S.	Memphis, TN
G	11	Bobby Perez	5 ft 11 in (1.8 m)	175 lb (79 kg)	Jr	Marist	Atlanta, GA
G	12	Dishon Lowery	6 ft 7 in (2.01 m)	240 lb (109 kg)	So	McIntosh H.S.	St. Louis, MO
G	15	Trevor Stumpe	6 ft 5 in (1.96 m)	201 lb (91 kg)	So	Plainfield North	Plainfield, IL
G	21	Tray Hollowell	6 ft 2 in (1.88 m)	185 lb (84 kg)	Fr	University Heights Academy	Hopkinsville, KY
F	24	Keve Aluma	6 ft 9 in (2.06 m)	225 lb (102 kg)	Fr	Stephen Decatur H.S.	Berlin, MD
G	31	Donovan Theme-Love	6 ft 1 in (1.85 m)	185 lb (84 kg)	So	New Hampton School	Providence, RI
F	33	Cameron Jackson	6 ft 8 in (2.03 m)	245 lb (111 kg)	Jr	John Handley	Winchester, VA
G	34	Grayson Hickert	6 ft 7 in (2.01 m)	210 lb (95 kg)	Fr	Lake Norman Charter	Huntersville, NC
C	50	Matthew Pegram	6 ft 11 in (2.11 m)	250 lb (113 kg)	Jr	Wando H.S.	Mt. Pleasant, SC

Head coach

- Mike Young (Emory & Henry)

Assistant coach(es)

- Jay McAuley (Georgia)
- Kevin Giltner (Wofford)
- Will Murphy (Wake Forest)

Legend

- (C) Team captain
- (S) Suspended
- (I) Ineligible
- (W) Walk-on
- Injured
- Current redshirt

Roster

== Schedule and results ==
Date time, TV	Rank^{#}	Opponent^{#}	Result	Record	High points	High rebounds	High assists	Site (attendance) city, state
Regular season
November 10, 2017*; 7:00 pm, ESPN3		South Carolina	L 53–73	0–1	17 – Magee	9 – Jackson	4 – Murphy	Jerry Richardson Indoor Stadium (3,400); Spartanburg, SC
November 12*; 2:00 pm		Washington and Lee; Maui on the Mainland	W 103–66	1–1	19 – Jackson	7 – Jackson	4 – Tied	Jerry Richardson Indoor Stadium (1,917); Spartanburg, SC
November 16*; 6:00 pm, P12N		at California; Maui on the Mainland	L 65–79	1–2	32 – Magee	3 – Tied	7 – Hoover	Haas Pavilion (6,102); Berkeley, CA
November 18*; 1:00 pm		Bob Jones; Maui on the Mainland	W 96–65	2–1	23 – Magee	10 – Aluma	7 – Murphy	Jerry Richardson Indoor Stadium (300); Spartanburg, SC
November 19*; 2:00 pm, ESPN3		North Florida; Maui on the Mainland	W 86–83	3–1	31 – Magee	10 – Jackson	8 – Murphy	Jerry Richardson Indoor Stadium (1,632); Spartanburg, SC
November 22*; 5:30 pm, FSSW+		at Texas Tech	L 56–79	3–3	16 – Hoover	8 – Jackson	5 – Murphy	United Supermarkets Arena (7,526); Lubbock, TX
November 26*; 4:30 pm, My40		at UNC Asheville	L 65–85	3–4	20 – Magee	5 – Tied	3 – Tied	Kimmel Arena (1,323); Asheville, NC
November 29*; 7:00 pm		at Coastal Carolina	W 87–81	4–4	26 – Magee	7 – Pegram	7 – Magee	HTC Center (1,446); Conway, SC
December 6*; 7:00 pm		Georgia Tech	W 63–60	5–4	36 – Magee	10 – Jackson	4 – Theme-Love	Jerry Richardson Indoor Arena (2,419); Spartanburg, SC
December 9*; 4:00 pm		Johnson & Wales (NC)	W 104–45	6–3	22 – Magee	7 – Tied	5 – Brooks	Jerry Richardson Indoor Stadium (334); Spartanburg, SC
December 17*; 2:00 pm		vs. High Point; Mountain Invitational	W 70–57	7–4	27 – Magee	9 – Brooks	4 – Murphy	U.S. Cellular Center (1,423); Asheville, NC
December 20*; 9:00 pm, ESPN2		at No. 5 North Carolina	W 79–75	8–4	27 – Magee	9 – Jackson	3 – Tied	Dean E. Smith Center (16,017); Chapel Hill, NC
December 30; 5:00 pm, ESPN3		at UNC Greensboro	L 67–71	8–5 (0–1)	21 – Magee	9 – Stumpe	7 – Murphy	Greensboro Coliseum (2,420); Greensboro, NC
January 4, 2018; 7:00 pm, ESPN3		VMI	W 92–53	9–5 (1–1)	25 – Magee	5 – Tied	3 – Tied	Jerry Richardson Indoor Stadium (1,879); Spartanburg, SC
January 6; 7:00 pm, ESPN3		The Citadel	W 109–92	10–5 (2–1)	21 – Hoover	13 – Jackson	4 – Stumpe	Jerry Richardson Indoor Stadium (3,078); Spartanburg, SC
January 10*; 7:00 pm, ESPN3		Harvard	W 63–62	11–5	19 – Magee	7 – Tied	4 – Tied	Jerry Richardson Indoor Stadium (2,259); Spartanburg, SC
January 13; 7:00 pm, ESPN3		Furman	W 79–70	12–5 (3–1)	20 – Tied	6 – Tied	7 – Murphy	Jerry Richardson Indoor Stadium (3,400); Spartanburg, SC
January 18; 8:00 pm, ESPN3		at Samford	W 93–89	13–5 (4–1)	31 – Magee	12 – Brooks	7 – Stumpe	Pete Hanna Center (1,414); Birmingham, AL
January 20; 7:00 pm, ESPN3		Chattanooga	W 71–67	14–5 (5–1)	26 – Magee	7 – Stumpe	5 – Murphy	Jerry Richardson Indoor Stadium (2,983); Spartanburg, SC
January 24; 7:00 pm, ESPN3		at VMI	W 63–46	15–5 (6–1)	19 – Stumpe	5 – Tied	3 – Magee	Cameron Hall (882); Lexington, VA
January 27; 7:00 pm, ESPN3		East Tennessee State	L 62–75	15–6 (6–2)	21 – Magee	8 – Brooks	2 – Tied	Jerry Richardson Indoor Stadium (3,400); Spartanburg, SC
January 29; 7:00 pm, Stadium		Western Carolina	W 77–68	16–6 (7–2)	18 – Magee	8 – Brooks	4 – Tied	Jerry Richardson Indoor Stadium (1,785); Spartanburg, SC
February 1; 6:00 pm, ESPN3		at The Citadel	L 78–80	16–7 (7–3)	21 – Magee	8 – Brooks	7 – Murphy	McAlister Field House (1,008); Charleston, SC
February 3; 4:30 pm, ESPN3		at Mercer	L 65–73	16–8 (7–4)	23 – Magee	10 – Stumpe	3 – Tied	Hawkins Arena (3,267); Macon, GA
February 7; 7:00 pm, ESPN3		Samford	W 92–79	17–8 (8–4)	27 – Magee	7 – Stumpe	6 – Murphy	Jerry Richardson Indoor Stadium (1,489); Spartanburg, SC
February 10; 4:30 pm, ESPN3		at Furman	L 52–76	17–9 (8–5)	10 – Tied	7 – Tied	4 – Theme-Love	Timmons Arena (2,552); Greenville, SC
February 15; 7:30 pm, ESPN3		at Western Carolina	W 84–69	18–9 (9–5)	21 – Magee	7 – Tied	4 – Stumpe	Ramsey Center (1,121); Cullowhee, NC
February 17; 5:00 pm, ESPN3		at Chattanooga	W 74–64	19–9 (10–5)	45 – Magee	6 – Hoover	4 – Murphy	McKenzie Arena (4,235); Chattanooga, TN
February 20; 7:00 pm, ESPN3		UNC Greensboro	L 66–76	19–10 (10–6)	20 – Magee	6 – Jackson	5 – Murphy	Jerry Richardson Indoor Stadium (1,452); Spartanburg, SC
February 23; 7:00 pm, ESPN3		at East Tennessee State	W 75–71	20–10 (11–6)	18 – Jackson	7 – Jackson	4 – Tied	Freedom Hall Civic Center (6,005); Johnson City, TN
February 25; 7:00 pm, ESPN3		Mercer	L 68–69	20–11 (11–7)	17 – Jackson	6 – Stumpe	8 – Murphy	Jerry Richardson Indoor Stadium (1,930); Spartanburg, SC
SoCon tournament
March 3; 2:30 pm, ESPN3	(5)	vs. (4) Mercer; Quarterfinals	W 73–53	21–11	22 – Hoover	10 – Jackson	3 – Hoover	U.S. Cellular Center (4,863); Asheville, NC
March 4; 4:00 pm, ESPN3	(5)	vs. (1) UNC Greensboro; Semifinals	L 55–56	21–12	14 – Magee	8 – Jackson	4 – Jackson	U.S. Cellular Center (5,546); Asheville, NC
CIT
March 16*; 7:00 pm		Central Michigan; Second round	L 94–98	21–13	37 – Magee	9 – Jackson	9 – Murphy	Jerry Richardson Indoor Stadium (1,448); Spartanburg, SC
*Non-conference game. ^{#}Rankings from AP Poll. (#) Tournament seedings in parentheses. All times are in Eastern Time.
