= 2017–18 East Tennessee State Buccaneers men's basketball team =

American college basketball season

2017–18 East Tennessee State Buccaneers men's basketball
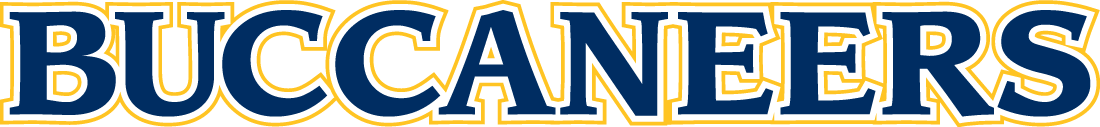
- Conference: Southern Conference
- Record: 25–9 (14–4 SoCon)
- Head coach: Steve Forbes (3rd season)
- Assistant coaches: Jason Shay; Brooks Savage; BJ McKie
- Home arena: Freedom Hall Civic Center

2017–18 Southern Conference men's basketball standings
	Conf.				Overall
Team	W		L	PCT	W		L	PCT
UNC Greensboro †	15	–	3	.833	27	–	8	.771
East Tennessee State	14	–	4	.778	25	–	9	.735
Furman	13	–	5	.722	23	–	10	.697
Mercer	11	–	7	.611	19	–	15	.559
Wofford	11	–	7	.611	21	–	13	.618
Western Carolina	8	–	10	.444	13	–	19	.406
Samford	6	–	12	.333	10	–	22	.313
The Citadel	5	–	13	.278	11	–	21	.344
VMI	4	–	14	.222	9	–	21	.300
Chattanooga	3	–	15	.167	10	–	23	.303
† 2018 SoCon Tournament winner

The 2017–18 East Tennessee Buccaneers basketball team represented East Tennessee State University during the 2017–18 NCAA Division I men's basketball season. The Buccaneers, led by third-year head coach Steve Forbes, played their home games at the Freedom Hall Civic Center in Johnson City, Tennessee as of the Southern Conference. They finished the season 25–9, 14–4 in SoCon play to finish in second place. They defeated Chattanooga and Furman to advance to the championship game of the SoCon tournament where they lost to UNC Greensboro. Despite having 25 wins, they did not participate in a postseason tournament.

== Previous season ==
The Buccaneers finished the 2016–17 season 27–8, 14–4 in SoCon play to finish in a three-way tie for the SoCon regular season championship. They defeated Mercer, Samford and UNC Greensboro to become champions of the SoCon tournament. They earned the SoCon's automatic bid to the NCAA tournament where they lost in the first round to Florida.

== Roster ==
2017–18 East Tennessee State Buccaneers men's basketball team
Players
Coaches
}

Pos.	#	Name	Height	Weight	Year	Hometown
G	0	Kanayo Obi-Rapu	6 ft 3 in (1.91 m)	195 lb (88 kg)	Jr	Greensboro, North Carolina
G	1	Desonta Bradford	6 ft 4 in (1.93 m)	190 lb (86 kg)	Sr	Humboldt, Tennessee
F	2	David Burrell	6 ft 6 in (1.98 m)	200 lb (91 kg)	Sr	Milwaukee, Wisconsin
G	3	Bo Hodges	6 ft 4 in (1.93 m)	190 lb (86 kg)	Fr	Nashville, Tennessee
G	4	Jason Williams	5 ft 11 in (1.8 m)	185 lb (84 kg)	So	Detroit, Michigan
C	5	Peter Jurkin	7 ft 0 in (2.13 m)	245 lb (111 kg)	RS Sr	Juba, South Sudan
F	10	Kendrick Gray	6 ft 6 in (1.98 m)	220 lb (100 kg)	Fr	Newport, Vermont
G	11	Devontavius Payne	6 ft 2 in (1.88 m)	175 lb (79 kg)	Sr	Carbondale, Illinois
G	12	Jalan McCloud	5 ft 11 in (1.8 m)	175 lb (79 kg)	Sr	Fort Worth, Texas
F	13	Jeromy Rodriguez	6 ft 7 in (2.01 m)	225 lb (102 kg)	Jr	Santiago, Dominican Republic
G	15	Patrick Good	6 ft 0 in (1.83 m)	165 lb (75 kg)	So	Johnson City, Tennessee
F	20	James Harrison	6 ft 8 in (2.03 m)	225 lb (102 kg)	Jr	Dallas, Texas
G	23	Dillon Reppart	6 ft 3 in (1.91 m)	180 lb (82 kg)	Sr	Johnson City, Tennessee
G	24	Jermaine Long	6 ft 3 in (1.91 m)	180 lb (82 kg)	Sr	New Orleans, Louisiana
F	33	Mladen Armus	6 ft 10 in (2.08 m)	230 lb (104 kg)	Fr	Belgrade, Serbia
C	34	Karl Overstreet	6 ft 10 in (2.08 m)	240 lb (109 kg)	Sr	Lynchburg, Virginia

Head coach

- Steve Forbes

Assistant coach(es)

- Jason Shay
- Brooks Savage
- BJ McKie

Legend

- (C) Team captain
- (S) Suspended
- (I) Ineligible
- (W) Walk-on
- Injured
- Current redshirt

Roster
Last update: January 4, 2018

== Schedule and results ==
Date time, TV	Rank^{#}	Opponent^{#}	Result	Record	Site (attendance) city, state
Non-conference regular season
Nov 10, 2017*; 7:00 pm, ESPN3		at Northern Kentucky	L 63–81	0–1	BB&T Arena (3,586); Highland Heights, KY
Nov 13, 2017*; 7:00 pm		at Savannah State; Adolph Rupp Classic	W 76–61	1–1	Tiger Arena (965); Savannah, GA
Nov 17, 2017*; 7:00 pm, SECN		at No. 7 Kentucky; Adolph Rupp Classic	L 61–78	1–2	Rupp Arena (20,378); Lexington, KY
Nov 20, 2017*; 7:00 pm, ESPN3		Delaware State; Adolph Rupp Classic	W 81–57	2–2	Freedom Hall Civic Center (3,562); Johnson City, TN
Nov 22, 2017*; 7:00 pm, ESPN3		Troy; Adolph Rupp Classic	L 65–73	2–3	Freedom Hall Civic Center; Johnson City, TN
Nov 25, 2017*; 7:00 pm, ESPN3		Fort Wayne; Adolph Rupp Classic	W 83–73	3–3	Freedom Hall Civic Center (2,919); Johnson City, TN
Nov 29, 2017*; 7:00 pm		at Fordham	W 82–77	4–3	Rose Hill Gymnasium (1,158); Bronx, NY
Dec 6, 2017*; 7:00 pm, ESPN3		Northern Kentucky	W 84–71	5–3	Freedom Hall Civic Center (3,484); Johnson City, TN
Dec 10, 2017*; 7:00 pm, ESPN3		Hiwassee	W 94–48	6–3	Freedom Hall Civic Center (3,321); Johnson City, TN
Dec 16, 2017*; 2:00 pm, FSN		at No. 10 Xavier	L 66–68	6–4	Cintas Center (10,432); Cincinnati, OH
Dec 19, 2017*; 7:00 pm, ESPN3		at Detroit	W 81–73	7–4	Calihan Hall (893); Detroit, MI
Dec 22, 2017*; 6:00 pm, ESPN3		Georgia Southern	W 79–59	8–4	Freedom Hall Civic Center (4,050); Johnson City, TN
Dec 28, 2017*; 6:00 pm, ESPN3		Tusculum	W 84–65	9–4	Freedom Hall Civic Center (3,218); Johnson City, TN
SoCon regular season
Dec 31, 2017; 1:00 pm, ESPN3		at Mercer	W 74–55	10–4 (1–0)	Hawkins Arena (3,069); Macon, GA
Jan 4, 2018; 8:00 pm, ESPN3		at Samford	W 90–72	11–4 (2–0)	Pete Hanna Center (894); Homewood, AL
Jan 6, 2018; 5:00 pm, ESPN3		at Chattanooga	W 85–66	12–4 (3–0)	McKenzie Arena (4,444); Chattanooga, TN
Jan 11, 2018; 7:00 pm, ESPN3		UNC Greensboro	W 68–58	13–4 (4–0)	Freedom Hall Civic Center (5,038); Johnson City, TN
Jan 13, 2018; 4:00 pm, ESPN3		VMI	W 89–48	14–4 (5–0)	Freedom Hall Civic Center (4,218); Johnson City, TN
Jan 18, 2018; 7:00 pm, ESPN3		at Furman	W 62–61	15–4 (6–0)	Timmons Arena (1,806); Greenville, SC
Jan 20, 2018; 4:00 pm, ESPN3		Western Carolina	W 66-50	16-4 (7-0)	Freedom Hall Civic Center (5,412); Johnson City, TN
Jan 24, 2018; 7:00 pm, ESPN3		Mercer	W 84–75	17–4 (8–0)	Freedom Hall Civic Center (4,770); Johnson City, TN
Jan 27, 2018; 7:00 pm, ESPN3		at Wofford	W 75–62	18–4 (9–0)	Jerry Richardson Indoor Stadium (3,400); Spartanburg, SC
Jan 29, 2018; 6:00 pm, ESPN3		at The Citadel	W 73–71	19–4 (10–0)	McAlister Field House (412); Charleston, SC
Feb 1, 2018; 7:00 pm, ESPN3		Samford	W 96–76	20–4 (11–0)	Freedom Hall Civic Center (5,019); Johnson City, TN
Feb 3, 2018; 4:00 pm, ESPN3		Chattanooga	W 81–61	21–4 (12–0)	Freedom Hall Civic Center (6,149); Johnson City, TN
Feb 10, 2018; 1:00 pm, ESPN3		at VMI	W 70–56	22–4 (13–0)	Cameron Hall (3,253); Lexington, VA
Feb 12, 2018; 7:00 pm, ESPN3		at UNC Greensboro	L 56–74	22–5 (13–1)	Greensboro Coliseum (4,179); Greensboro, NC
Feb 17, 2018; 2:00 pm, ESPN3		at Western Carolina	W 72–61	23–5 (14–1)	Ramsey Center (1,836); Cullowhee, NC
Feb 20, 2018; 7:00 pm, ESPN3		The Citadel	L 82–84	23–6 (14–2)	Freedom Hall Civic Center (4,911); Johnson City, TN
Feb 23, 2018; 7:00 pm, ESPN3		Wofford	L 71–75	23–7 (14–3)	Freedom Hall Civic Center (6,005); Johnson City, TN
Feb 25, 2018; 2:00 pm, ESPN3		Furman	L 76–79	23–8 (14–4)	Freedom Hall Civic Center (5,908); Johnson City, TN
SoCon tournament
Mar 3, 2018; 8:30 pm, ESPN3	(2)	vs. (10) Chattanooga; Quarterfinals	W 77–59	24–8	U.S. Cellular Center (5,431); Asheville, NC
Mar 4, 2018; 6:30 pm, ESPN3	(2)	vs. (3) Furman; Semifinals	W 63–52	25–8	U.S. Cellular Center (5,546); Asheville, NC
Mar 5, 2018; 9:00 pm, ESPN2	(1)	vs. (1) UNC Greensboro; Championship game	L 47–62	25–9	U.S. Cellular Center (5,823); Asheville, NC
*Non-conference game. ^{#}Rankings from AP Poll. (#) Tournament seedings in parentheses. E=East Region. All times are in Eastern Time.
