= 2017–18 The Citadel Bulldogs basketball team =

American college basketball season

2017–18 The Citadel Bulldogs basketball
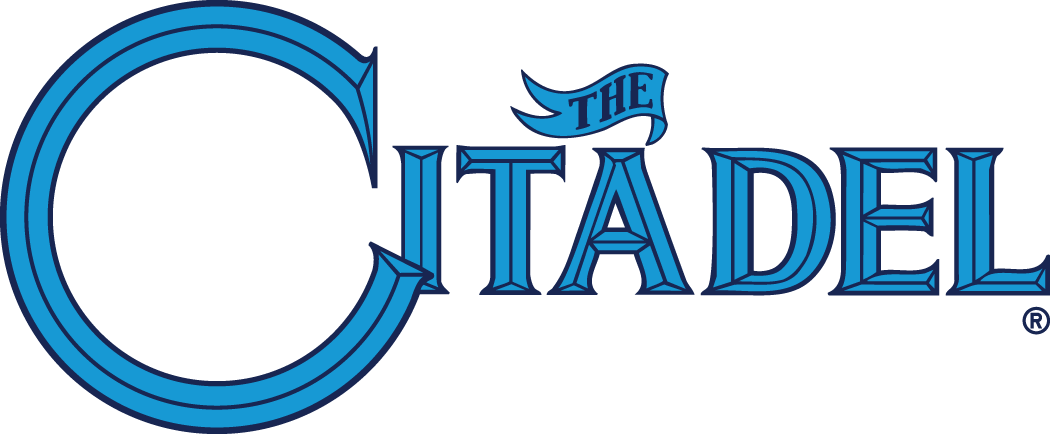
- Conference: Southern Conference
- Record: 11–21 (5–13 SoCon)
- Head coach: Duggar Baucom
- Assistant coaches: Daniel Willis; Willie Bell; Jack Castleberry
- Home arena: McAlister Field House

2017–18 Southern Conference men's basketball standings
	Conf.				Overall
Team	W		L	PCT	W		L	PCT
UNC Greensboro †	15	–	3	.833	27	–	8	.771
East Tennessee State	14	–	4	.778	25	–	9	.735
Furman	13	–	5	.722	23	–	10	.697
Mercer	11	–	7	.611	19	–	15	.559
Wofford	11	–	7	.611	21	–	13	.618
Western Carolina	8	–	10	.444	13	–	19	.406
Samford	6	–	12	.333	10	–	22	.313
The Citadel	5	–	13	.278	11	–	21	.344
VMI	4	–	14	.222	9	–	21	.300
Chattanooga	3	–	15	.167	10	–	23	.303
† 2018 SoCon Tournament winner

The 2017–18 The Citadel Bulldogs basketball team represented The Citadel, The Military College of South Carolina in the 2017–18 NCAA Division I men's basketball season. The Bulldogs were led by third-year head coach Duggar Baucom and played their home games at McAlister Field House as members of the Southern Conference, as they have since 1936–37. They finished the season 11–21, 5–13 in SoCon play to finish in eighth place. They defeated VMI in the first round of the SoCon tournament before losing in the quarterfinals to UNC Greensboro.

== Previous season ==
The Bulldogs finished the 2016–17 season 12–21, 4–14 in SoCon play to finish tied for eighth place. They lost in the quarterfinal d of the SoCon tournament to top-seeded UNC Greensboro after defeating Western Carolina.

== Preseason ==
=== Departures ===
The Bulldogs saw four players complete their eligibility in 2016–17, three of whom graduated while the fourth was completing a graduate season. Warren Sledge, Tom Koopman and Brian White graduated, while Bobby Duncan completed his final year of eligibility as a graduate student. Four other players from the 2016–17 roster are not on the 2017–18 team: Ezekiel Balogun transferred to Eastern Florida State College, Aaron Washington transferred to Labette Community College, while Griffin Peevey and Chris Ross also are not on the roster.

Name	Position	Class	Reason
Ezekiel Balogun	F	FR	Transfer
Bobby Duncan	F	GR	Graduation
Tom Koopman	C	SR	Graduation
Griffin Peevey	C	FR	
Chris Ross	G	FR	
Warren Sledge	G	SR	Graduation
Aaron Washington	G	FR	Transfer
Brian White	F	SR	Graduation

=== Recruiting ===
Duggar Baucom and his staff signed six players to enter in 2017.

College recruiting information
Name	Hometown	School	Height	Weight	Commit date
Hayden Brown; SF	Duncan, SC	James Byrnes High School	6 ft 5 in (1.96 m)	N/A	
Hayden Brown; SF	Recruit ratings: (NR)				
Robert Johnson; PF	Fort Lauderdale, FL	Dillard High School	6 ft 8 in (2.03 m)	205 lb (93 kg)	
Robert Johnson; PF	Recruit ratings: ESPN: (62)				
Alex Reed; SF	Garner, NC	Garner Senior High School	6 ft 5 in (1.96 m)	N/A	
Alex Reed; SF	Recruit ratings: (NR)				
Kaiden Rice; SF	Columbia, SC	Ridge View High School	6 ft 6 in (1.98 m)	N/A	
Kaiden Rice; SF	Recruit ratings: (NR)				
Tariq Simmons; SG	Columbia, SC	W. J. Keenan High School	6 ft 2 in (1.88 m)	N/A	
Tariq Simmons; SG	Recruit ratings: (NR)				
Derek Webster; SF	Seffner, FL	Seffner Christian Academy	6 ft 5 in (1.96 m)	210 lb (95 kg)	
Derek Webster; SF	Recruit ratings: (NR)				
Overall recruit ranking:
Note: In many cases, Scout, Rivals, 247Sports, On3, and ESPN may conflict in their listings of height and weight.; In these cases, the average was taken. ESPN grades are on a 100-point scale.; Sources: "ESPN – Citadel Basketball Recruiting 2017". ESPN.; "2017 Team Ranking". Rivals.

== Roster ==
The Bulldogs roster will have no seniors and six freshmen.

2017–18 The Citadel Bulldogs men's basketball team
Players
Coaches

Pos.	#	Name	Height	Weight	Year	Previous school	Hometown
G	0	Preston Parks	6 ft 1 in (1.85 m)	175 lb (79 kg)	So	Wade Hampton HS	Greenville, South Carolina
G	1	Frankie Johnson	5 ft 9 in (1.75 m)	150 lb (68 kg)	So	Darlington HS	Darlington, South Carolina
G	2	Quayson Williams	5 ft 11 in (1.8 m)	170 lb (77 kg)	Jr	Eastern Guilford HS	Greensboro, North Carolina
G	3	Matt Frierson	6 ft 1 in (1.85 m)	150 lb (68 kg)	Jr	Chapelgate Christian Academy	Laurel, Maryland
F	4	Tariq Simmons	6 ft 0 in (1.83 m)	180 lb (82 kg)	Fr	W. J. Keenan HS	Columbia, South Carolina
G	5	Rob Johnson	6 ft 8 in (2.03 m)	190 lb (86 kg)	Fr	Dillard HS	Fort Lauderdale, Florida
G	10	Leandro Allende	6 ft 6 in (1.98 m)	190 lb (86 kg)	So	Chaminade Madonna Prep	Caguas, Puerto Rico
F	11	Kaiden Rice	6 ft 6 in (1.98 m)	180 lb (82 kg)	Fr	Ridge View HS	Columbia, South Carolina
G	23	Kaelon Harris	6 ft 4 in (1.93 m)	225 lb (102 kg)	So	Mundy's Mill HS	Tulsa, Oklahoma
F	24	Tyler Burgess	6 ft 7 in (2.01 m)	195 lb (88 kg)	So	Easley HS	Easley, South Carolina
F	25	Alex Reed	6 ft 5 in (1.96 m)	205 lb (93 kg)	Fr	Garner Magnet HS	Garner, North Carolina
F	32	Derek Webster Jr.	6 ft 5 in (1.96 m)	205 lb (93 kg)	Fr	Seffner Christian Academy	Seffner, Florida
F	33	Hayden Brown	6 ft 6 in (1.98 m)	220 lb (100 kg)	Fr	James Byrnes HS	Duncan, South Carolina
F	35	Zane Najdawi	6 ft 7 in (2.01 m)	205 lb (93 kg)	Jr	Cosby HS	Midlothian, Virginia

Head coach

- Duggar Baucom (UNC Charlotte)

Assistant coach(es)

- Daniel Willis (Lenoir–Rhyne)
- Willie Bell (VMI)
- Jack Castleberry (VMI)

Legend

- (C) Team captain
- (S) Suspended
- (I) Ineligible
- (W) Walk-on
- Injured
- Current redshirt

Roster

== Schedule and results ==
The Bulldogs played three games during a 10-day trip to Dominican Republic. For the first time in many years, The Citadel and crosstown rival College of Charleston will not meet.

Date time, TV	Rank^{#}	Opponent^{#}	Result	Record	Site (attendance) city, state
Dominican Republic Exhibition Tour
August 13, 2017*		vs. Dominican Republic U19 Select Team	L 125–134		Punta Cana, Dominican Republic
August 14*		vs. Higueyana U25 Select Team	Cancelled		Punta Cana, Dominican Republic
August 16*		vs. Dominican Republic U19 Select Team	Cancelled		Punta Cana, Dominican Republic
Exhibition
October 29*; 3:00 pm		at Lenoir–Rhyne; Hurricane disaster relief charity game	L 83–97		Shuford Gymnasium (945); Hickory, NC
November 3*; 3:00 pm		Coker	W 122–98	–	McAlister Field House (305); Charleston, SC
Non-conference regular season
November 10, 2017*; 3:00 pm		Oglethorpe; Jamaica Classic Montego Bay	W 109–73	1–0	McAlister Field House (343); Charleston, SC
November 12, 2017*; 7:00 pm, ACCN Extra		at Virginia Tech	L 93–132	1–1	Cassell Coliseum (9,275); Blacksburg, VA
November 15, 2017*; 7:00 pm, Lock TV		at North Carolina A&T	L 73–92	1–2	Corbett Sports Center (2,648); Greensboro, NC
November 18, 2017*; 2:00 pm		at High Point	W 79–77	2–2	Millis Athletic Convocation Center (1,147); High Point, NC
November 21, 2017*; 6:00 pm		Trinity Baptist; Jamaica Classic Montego Bay	W 116–66	3–2	McAlister Field House (367); Charleston, SC
November 24, 2017*; 8:00 pm, ACCN Extra		at Florida State; Jamaica Classic Campus game	L 78–113	3–3	Donald L. Tucker Civic Center (6,021); Tallahassee, FL
December 1, 2017*; 3:00 pm, ESPN3		Marist; Bulldog Bash	L 91–100	3–4	McAlister Field House (609); Charleston, SC
December 2, 2017*; 2:00 pm, ESPN3		UMBC; Bulldog Bash	L 72–98	3–5	McAlister Field House (673); Charleston, SC
December 5, 2017*; 6:00 pm, ESPN3		James Madison	W 84–82	4–5	McAlister Field House (744); Charleston, SC
December 14, 2017*; 7:00 pm		at Campbell	L 77–87	4–6	John W. Pope Jr. Convocation Center (1,131); Buies Creek, NC
December 16, 2017*; 1:00 pm		Point	W 110–66	5–6	McAlister Field House (347); Charleston, SC
December 19, 2017*; 7:00 pm, BTN		at Ohio State	L 65–94	5–7	Value City Arena (10,752); Columbus, OH
Regular season
December 30, 2017; 1:00 pm, ESPN3		Western Carolina	L 79–81	5–8 (0–1)	McAlister Field House (546); Charleston, SC
January 4, 2018; 7:30 pm, ESPN3		at Furman	L 67–107	5–9 (0–2)	Timmons Arena (1,509); Greenville, SC
January 6, 2018; 7:00 pm, ESPN3		at Wofford	L 92–109	5–10 (0–3)	Jerry Richardson Indoor Stadium (3,078); Spartanburg, SC
January 11, 2018; 6:00 pm, ESPN3		Samford	L 91–107	5–11 (0–4)	McAlister Field House (323); Charleston, SC
January 13, 2018; 1:00 pm, ESPN3		Chattanooga	W 110–101 ^{OT}	6–11 (1–4)	McAlister Field House (573); Charleston, SC
January 18, 2018; 7:00 pm, ESPN3		at UNC Greensboro	L 58–72	6–12 (1–5)	Greensboro Coliseum (3,135); Greensboro, NC
January 20, 2018; 1:00 pm, ESPN3		at VMI; Rivalry	L 81–88	6–13 (1–6)	Cameron Hall (3,500); Lexington, VA
January 27, 2018; 4:00 pm, ESPN3		at Mercer	W 76–74	7–13 (2–6)	Hawkins Arena (2,972); Macon, GA
January 29, 2018; 6:00 pm, ESPN3		East Tennessee State	L 71–73	7–14 (2–7)	McAlister Field House (412); Charleston, SC
February 1, 2018; 6:00 pm, ESPN3		Wofford	W 80–78	8–14 (3–7)	McAlister Field House (1,008); Charleston, SC
February 3, 2018; 1:00 pm, ESPN3		Furman	W 100–92 ^{OT}	9–14 (4–7)	McAlister Field House (983); Charleston, SC
February 8, 2018; 7:00 pm, ESPN3		at Chattanooga	L 82–85	9–15 (4–8)	McKenzie Arena (2,409); Chattanooga, TN
February 10, 2018; 8:00 pm, ESPN3		at Samford	L 103–116	9–16 (4–9)	Pete Hanna Center (1,544); Homewood, AL
February 15, 2018; 6:00 pm, ESPN3		UNC Greensboro	L 66–82	9–17 (4–10)	McAlister Field House (479); Charleston, SC
February 17, 2018; 1:00 pm, ESPN3		VMI; Rivalry	L 71–75	9–18 (4–11)	McAlister Field House (3,213); Charleston, SC
February 20, 2018; 7:00 pm, ESPN3		at East Tennessee State	W 84–82	10–18 (5–11)	Freedom Hall Civic Center (4,911); Johnson City, TN
February 23, 2018; 6:00 pm, ESPN3		Mercer	L 70–83	10–19 (5–12)	McAlister Field House (737); Charleston, SC
February 25, 2018; 2:00 pm, ESPN3		Western Carolina	L 75–92	10–20 (5–13)	McAlister Field House (1,236); Charleston, SC
SoCon tournament
March 2, 2018; 7:30 pm, ESPN3	(8)	vs. (9) VMI; First round	W 78–70	11–20	U.S. Cellular Center (2,138); Asheville, NC
March 2, 2018; 12:00 pm, ESPN3	(8)	vs. (1) UNC Greensboro; Quarterfinals	L 58–72	11–21	U.S. Cellular Center (4,863); Asheville, NC
*Non-conference game. (#) Tournament seedings in parentheses. All times are in Eastern Time.
