= 2017–18 UNC Greensboro Spartans men's basketball team =

American college basketball season

2017–18 UNC Greensboro Spartans men's basketball

SoCon regular season and tournament champions

NCAA tournament, First Round
- Conference: Southern Conference
- Record: 27–8 (15–3 SoCon)
- Head coach: Wes Miller (7th season)
- Assistant coaches: Mike Roberts; Andre Morgan; Chris Parsons
- Home arena: Greensboro Coliseum Complex; Fleming Gymnasium

2017–18 Southern Conference men's basketball standings
	Conf.				Overall
Team	W		L	PCT	W		L	PCT
UNC Greensboro †	15	–	3	.833	27	–	8	.771
East Tennessee State	14	–	4	.778	25	–	9	.735
Furman	13	–	5	.722	23	–	10	.697
Mercer	11	–	7	.611	19	–	15	.559
Wofford	11	–	7	.611	21	–	13	.618
Western Carolina	8	–	10	.444	13	–	19	.406
Samford	6	–	12	.333	10	–	22	.313
The Citadel	5	–	13	.278	11	–	21	.344
VMI	4	–	14	.222	9	–	21	.300
Chattanooga	3	–	15	.167	10	–	23	.303
† 2018 SoCon Tournament winner

The 2017–18 UNC Greensboro Spartans men's basketball team represented the University of North Carolina at Greensboro during the 2017–18 NCAA Division I men's basketball season. The Spartans, led by seventh-year head coach Wes Miller, played their home games at the Greensboro Coliseum, with four home games at Fleming Gymnasium, as members of the Southern Conference. They finished the season 27–8, 15–3 in SoCon play, and were the SoCon regular season champions. They defeated The Citadel, Wofford, and East Tennessee State to become champions of the SoCon tournament. They received the SoCon's automatic bid to the NCAA tournament where they lost in the first round to Gonzaga.

== Previous season ==
The Spartans finished the 2016–17 season 25–10, 14–4 in SoCon play to finish in a three-way tie for the SoCon regular season championship. As the No. 1 seed in the SoCon tournament, they defeated The Citadel and Wofford to advance to the championship game where they lost to East Tennessee State. As a conference champion and No. 1 seed in their conference tournament who failed to win their conference tournament, they received an automatic bid to the National Invitation Tournament where they lost in the first round to Syracuse.

== Roster ==
2017–18 UNC Greensboro Spartans men's basketball team
Players
Coaches

Pos.	#	Name	Height	Weight	Year	Hometown
G/F	0	Kylia Sykes	6 ft 5 in (1.96 m)	195 lb (88 kg)	RS Fr	Washington, D.C.
F	1	Marvin Smith	6 ft 6 in (1.98 m)	205 lb (93 kg)	Sr	Richmond, Virginia
G	2	Malik Massey	6 ft 3 in (1.91 m)	195 lb (88 kg)	So	Charlotte, North Carolina
F	3	Jelani Mofford	6 ft 5 in (1.96 m)	187 lb (85 kg)	Jr	Mississauga, Ontario, Canada
G	10	Francis Alonso	6 ft 3 in (1.91 m)	185 lb (84 kg)	Jr	Málaga, Spain
G	11	Demetrius Troy	6 ft 0 in (1.83 m)	187 lb (85 kg)	Jr	Raleigh, North Carolina
G	13	Justin Jordan	6 ft 3 in (1.91 m)	185 lb (84 kg)	Sr	Davidson, North Carolina
F	14	Kyrin Galloway	6 ft 8 in (2.03 m)	215 lb (98 kg)	So	Milton, Georgia
F	15	Garrett Collins	6 ft 5 in (1.96 m)	200 lb (91 kg)	Sr	Asheville, North Carolina
F	21	James Dickey	6 ft 10 in (2.08 m)	200 lb (91 kg)	RS So	Raleigh, North Carolina
G	22	Jack Konstanzer	5 ft 11 in (1.8 m)	165 lb (75 kg)	RS Fr	Kill Devil Hills, North Carolina
G	24	Isaiah Miller	6 ft 0 in (1.83 m)	180 lb (82 kg)	Fr	Covington, Georgia
C	25	Lloyd Burgess	6 ft 11 in (2.11 m)	270 lb (122 kg)	Jr	Durham, North Carolina
F	32	Jordy Kuiper	6 ft 9 in (2.06 m)	250 lb (113 kg)	Sr	Groningen, Netherlands
F	35	Eric Hamilton	6 ft 9 in (2.06 m)	250 lb (113 kg)	Fr	Atlanta, Georgia
G	44	Kaleb Hunter	6 ft 4 in (1.93 m)	190 lb (86 kg)	Fr	Raleigh, North Carolina

Head coach

- Wes Miller (North Carolina)

Assistant coach(es)

- Mike Roberts (Indiana)
- Andre Morgan (North Georgia)
- Chris Parsons (Hofstra)

Legend

- (C) Team captain
- (S) Suspended
- (I) Ineligible
- (W) Walk-on
- Injured
- Current redshirt

Roster
Last update: December 29, 2017

== Schedule and results ==
Date time, TV	Rank^{#}	Opponent^{#}	Result	Record	Site (attendance) city, state
Non-conference regular season
Nov 10, 2017*; 7:00 pm, ACCN		at Virginia	L 48–60	0–1	John Paul Jones Arena (13,855); Charlottesville, VA
Nov 15, 2017*; 7:00 pm		North Carolina Wesleyan; Spartan Classic	W 82–48	1–1	Fleming Gymnasium (1,833); Greensboro, NC
Nov 17, 2017*; 7:00 pm		Ferrum; Spartan Classic	W 95–43	2–1	Fleming Gymnasium (1,767); Greensboro, NC
Nov 20, 2017*; 7:00 pm, ESPN3		Delaware; Spartan Classic	W 79–66	3–1	Greensboro Coliseum (2,249); Greensboro, NC
Nov 21, 2017*; 7:30 pm, ESPN3		Longwood; Spartan Classic	W 71–40	4–1	Greensboro Coliseum (1,635); Greensboro, NC
Nov 24, 2017*; 7:00 pm, ACCN		at Wake Forest	L 75–81	4–2	LJVM Coliseum (6,810); Winston-Salem, NC
Nov 28, 2017*; 7:00 pm		at Presbyterian	L 72–74	4–3	Templeton Physical Education Center (230); Clinton, SC
Dec 2, 2017*; 1:00 pm, ESPN3		at Liberty	W 76–75	5–3	Vines Center (2,294); Lynchburg, VA
Dec 7, 2017*; 7:00 pm, ESPN3		Elon	W 75–44	6–3	Greensboro Coliseum (2,446); Greensboro, NC
Dec 13, 2017*; 7:00 pm, ESPN3		UNC Wilmington	W 71–58	7–3	Greensboro Coliseum (2,307); Greensboro, NC
Dec 16, 2017*; 12:00 pm, FS South		at NC State	W 81–76	8–3	PNC Arena (13,957); Raleigh, NC
Dec 19, 2017*; 7:00 pm, ESPN3		UNC Asheville	L 60–67	8–4	Greensboro Coliseum (2,172); Greensboro, NC
Dec 21, 2017*; 5:00 pm		Southeastern (FL)	W 85–67	9–4	Fleming Gymnasium (1,335); Greensboro, NC
SoCon regular season
Dec 30, 2017; 5:00 pm, ESPN3		Wofford	W 71–67	10–4 (1–0)	Greensboro Coliseum (2,420); Greensboro, NC
Jan 6, 2018; 1:00 pm, ESPN3		at VMI	W 63–61	11–4 (2–1)	Cameron Hall (571); Lexington, VA
Jan 11, 2018; 7:00 pm, ESPN3		at East Tennessee State	L 58–68	11–5 (2–1)	Freedom Hall Civic Center (5,038); Johnson City, TN
Jan 13, 2018; 7:30 pm, ESPN3		at Western Carolina	W 66–55	12–5 (3–1)	Ramsey Center (1,237); Cullowhee, NC
Jan 18, 2018; 7:00 pm, ESPN3		The Citadel	W 72–58	13–5 (4–1)	Greensboro Coliseum (3,135); Greensboro, NC
Jan 20, 2018; 5:00 pm, ESPN3		Mercer	W 70–66 ^{OT}	14–5 (5–1)	Greensboro Coliseum (2,874); Greensboro, NC
Jan 24, 2018; 7:00 pm, ESPN3		Furman	W 71–61	15–5 (6–1)	Greensboro Coliseum (2,604); Greensboro, NC
Jan 27, 2018; 8:00 pm, ESPN3		at Samford	W 98–82	16–5 (7–1)	Pete Hanna Center (1,629); Birmingham, AL
Jan 29, 2018; 7:00 pm, ESPN3		at Chattanooga	L 85–87 ^{2OT}	16–6 (7–2)	McKenzie Arena (2,503); Chattanooga, TN
Feb 1, 2018; 7:00 pm, ESPN3		VMI	W 73–51	17–6 (8–2)	Greensboro Coliseum (2,572); Greensboro, NC
Feb 7, 2018; 7:00 pm, ESPN3		at Furman	W 80–67	18–6 (9–2)	Timmons Arena (1,560); Greenville, SC
Feb 10, 2018; 5:00 pm, ESPN3		Western Carolina	W 65–48	19–6 (10–2)	Fleming Gymnasium (1,983); Greensboro, NC
Feb 12, 2018; 7:00 pm, ESPN3		East Tennessee State	W 74–56	20–6 (11–2)	Greensboro Coliseum (4,179); Greensboro, NC
Feb 15, 2018; 6:00 pm, ESPN3		at The Citadel	W 82–66	21–6 (12–2)	McAlister Field House (479); Charleston, SC
Feb 17, 2018; 4:00 pm, ESPN3		at Mercer	L 74–77	21–7 (12–3)	Hawkins Arena (2,899); Macon, GA
Feb 20, 2018; 7:00 pm, ESPN3		at Wofford	W 76–66	22–7 (13–3)	Jerry Richardson Indoor Stadium (1,452); Spartanburg, SC
Feb 23, 2018; 7:00 pm, ESPN3		Chattanooga	W 72–51	23–7 (14–3)	Greensboro Coliseum (5,062); Greensboro, NC
Feb 25, 2018; 4:00 pm, ESPN3		Samford	W 88-75	24–7 (15–3)	Greensboro Coliseum (3,155); Greensboro, NC
SoCon tournament
Mar 3, 2018; 12:00 pm, ESPN3	(1)	vs. (8) The Citadel; Quarterfinals	W 72–58	25–7	U.S. Cellular Center (4,863); Asheville, NC
Mar 4, 2018; 4:00 pm, ESPN3	(1)	vs. (5) Wofford; Semifinals	W 56–55	26–7	U.S. Cellular Center (5,546); Asheville, NC
Mar 5, 2018; 9:00 pm, ESPN2	(1)	vs. (2) East Tennessee State; Championship	W 62–47	27–7	U.S. Cellular Center (5,823); Asheville, NC
NCAA tournament
Mar 15, 2018*; 1:30 pm, TNT	(13 W)	vs. (4 W) No. 8 Gonzaga; First Round	L 64–68	27–8	Taco Bell Arena (11,662); Boise, ID
*Non-conference game. ^{#}Rankings from AP Poll. (#) Tournament seedings in parentheses. W=West. All times are in Eastern Time.
