= 2017–18 VMI Keydets basketball team =

American college basketball season

2017–18 VMI Keydets basketball
- Conference: Southern Conference
- Record: 9–21 (4–14 SoCon)
- Head coach: Dan Earl (3rd season)
- Assistant coaches: Steve Lepore (3rd season); Austin Kenon (1st season); Kevin Carroll (1st season)
- Home arena: Cameron Hall

2017–18 Southern Conference men's basketball standings
	Conf.				Overall
Team	W		L	PCT	W		L	PCT
UNC Greensboro †	15	–	3	.833	27	–	8	.771
East Tennessee State	14	–	4	.778	25	–	9	.735
Furman	13	–	5	.722	23	–	10	.697
Mercer	11	–	7	.611	19	–	15	.559
Wofford	11	–	7	.611	21	–	13	.618
Western Carolina	8	–	10	.444	13	–	19	.406
Samford	6	–	12	.333	10	–	22	.313
The Citadel	5	–	13	.278	11	–	21	.344
VMI	4	–	14	.222	9	–	21	.300
Chattanooga	3	–	15	.167	10	–	23	.303
† 2018 SoCon Tournament winner

The 2017–18 VMI Keydets basketball team represented the Virginia Military Institute in the 2017–18 NCAA Division I men's basketball season. The Keydets were led by third-year head coach Dan Earl and played their home games out of Cameron Hall in Lexington, Virginia, their home since 1981, as members of the Southern Conference. They finished the season 9–21, 4–14 in SoCon play to finish in ninth place. They lost in the first round of the SoCon tournament to The Citadel.

== Previous season ==
The Keydets finished the 2016–17 season with an overall record of 6–24, and a 3–15 mark in SoCon play to finish in last place. They lost in the first round of the SoCon tournament to Samford. They lost their three leading scorers and rebounders in QJ Peterson, Julian Eleby, and Trey Chapman.

== Preseason ==
=== Departures ===
VMI experienced noticeable roster turnover from the previous year, losing their three starting seniors as well as several other players to transfer. This included the Keydets' leading scorer and rebounder, QJ Peterson, who averaged nearly 20 points per game. Overall, VMI lost 71% of their point production, over half of their rebounding, and 63% of their assists to either graduation or transfer.

Name	Position	Class	Reason
Chuchu Enechionyia	G/F	Fr.	Transferred to Lincoln Trail College (NJCAA)
Kuony Deng	F	Fr.	Transferred to Independence Community College
Marcus Larsson	G	Fr.	Transferred to West Virginia Wesleyan
Adrian Rich	G	So.	Left school
Will Weethee	G	So.	Left team
D'Andre Mahaffey	F	So.	Transferred to Talladega College (NAIA)
Trey Chapman	F	Sr.	Graduated
QJ Peterson	G	Sr.	Graduated
Julian Eleby	G	Sr.	Graduated

=== Coaching changes ===
The offseason saw the departure of two VMI assistant coaches. On April 7, 2017, Rice head coach Scott Pera announced the hiring of Chris Kreider as an assistant coach. Kreider had been with the Keydets for the previous two seasons under head coach Dan Earl. Five days later, on April 12, 2017, it was announced that Jason Slay, who had also been in his second year with the program, was given an assistant coaching position at Youngstown State.

In May, Earl announced the hiring of VMI basketball standout Austin Kenon as an assistant. Kenon played for VMI and ranks first in program history with 349 made three-pointers. Also that month, Earl added Kevin Carroll to the coaching staff, who had previously been the head coach at Division II Maryville University for seven seasons.

== Roster ==
2017–18 VMI Keydets men's basketball team
Players
Coaches

Pos.	#	Name	Height	Weight	Year	Previous school	Hometown
G	0	Austin Vereen	6 ft 4 in (1.93 m)	190 lb (86 kg)	Jr	Maret School	Washington, D.C.
G	1	Keith Smith	6 ft 0 in (1.83 m)	170 lb (77 kg)	So	San Ramon Valley	Danville, California
G	2	Garrett Gilkeson	6 ft 4 in (1.93 m)	200 lb (91 kg)	So	Parkersburg South	Parkersburg, West Virginia
C	4	Fred Iruafemi	6 ft 6 in (1.98 m)	200 lb (91 kg)	Sr	Middle Creek	Raleigh, North Carolina
F	10	Armani Branch (injured)	6 ft 6 in (1.98 m)	205 lb (93 kg)	Sr	Genesis Academy	Hampton, Virginia
F	25	Tyler Creammer	6 ft 10 in (2.08 m)	245 lb (111 kg)	So	Miller School	Parkton, North Carolina
G	12	Ta'Vonne Bond	6 ft 0 in (1.83 m)	183 lb (83 kg)	Fr	Mount Zion Christian Academy	Columbia, South Carolina
G	24	Will Miller	6 ft 8 in (2.03 m)	210 lb (95 kg)	So	Halifax County	South Boston, Virginia
F	3	Tragen Fahl	6 ft 8 in (2.03 m)	180 lb (82 kg)	Fr	Atlantic Shores Christian	Virginia Beach, Virginia
G	15	Myles Lewis	6 ft 5 in (1.96 m)	181 lb (82 kg)	Fr	Victory Rock Prep	Ashburn, Virginia
G	23	Bubba Parham	5 ft 11 in (1.8 m)	155 lb (70 kg)	Fr	Brookwood	Snellville, Georgia
G	5	Greg Parham	6 ft 4 in (1.93 m)	160 lb (73 kg)	Fr	Monacan	Snellville, Georgia
G	31	Sarju Patel	6 ft 3 in (1.91 m)	170 lb (77 kg)	Fr	Hargrave	Daleville, Virginia
G	11	Jordan Ratliffe	6 ft 0 in (1.83 m)	188 lb (85 kg)	Fr	Village Christian	Gibson, North Carolina

Head coach

- Dan Earl (Penn State '97)

Assistant coach(es)

- Steve Lepore (Wake Forest '03)
- Kevin Carroll (Berry '00)
- Austin Kenon (VMI '11)

Legend

- (C) Team captain
- (S) Suspended
- (I) Ineligible
- (W) Walk-on
- Injured
- Current redshirt

Roster

Ref:

=== Depth chart ===
Pos.	Starting 5	Bench 1	Bench 2
C	Tyler Creammer	Fred Iruafemi
G/F	Austin Vereen	Will Miller	Tragen Fahl
SF	Garrett Gilkeson	Sarju Patel	Myles Lewis
SG	Bubba Parham	Jordan Ratliffe	Ta'Vonne Bond
PG	Keith Smith	Greg Parham

== Schedule and results ==
Date time, TV	Rank^{#}	Opponent^{#}	Result	Record	Site (attendance) city, state
Non-conference regular season
November 10, 2017*; 7:00 pm, ACCN Extra		at N.C. State	L 67–102	0–1	PNC Arena (14,805); Raleigh, NC
November 14*; 7:00 pm		at Duquesne	L 61–77	0–2	A.J. Palumbo Center (1,307); Pittsburgh, PA
November 18*; 1:00 pm, ESPN3		Presbyterian	W 78–58	1–2	Cameron Hall (765); Lexington, VA
November 21*; 7:00 pm, ESPN3		Ohio Valley	W 81–66	2–2	Cameron Hall (765); Lexington, VA
November 25*; 4:00 pm		American	L 64–69	2–3	Bender Arena (422); Washington, DC
November 28*; 7:30 pm		at Charleston Southern	W 76–68	3–3	CSU Field House (881); North Charleston, SC
December 2*; 1:00 pm, ESPN3		Radford	L 50–63	3–4	Cameron Hall (2,681); Lexington, VA
December 5*; 7:00 pm		at Davidson	L 51–74	3–5	John M. Belk Arena; Davidson, NC
December 9*; 1:00 pm, ESPN3		Longwood	W 81–70	4–5	Cameron Hall (2,642); Lexington, VA
December 14*; 7:00 pm, ESPN3		Southern Wesleyan	W 90–52	5–5	Cameron Hall (661); Lexington, VA
December 22*; 7:00 pm, CBS6		at VCU	L 65–75	5–6	Siegel Center (7,637); Richmond, VA
Southern Conference regular season
December 30; 1:00 pm, ESPN3		Furman	L 57–87	5–7 (0–1)	Cameron Hall (637); Lexington, VA
January 4, 2018; 7:00 pm, ESPN3		at Wofford	L 53–92	5–8 (0–2)	Jerry Richardson Indoor Stadium (1,879); Spartanburg, SC
January 6; 1:00 pm, ESPN3		UNC Greensboro	L 61–63	5–9 (0–3)	Cameron Hall (571); Lexington, VA
January 13; 4:00 pm		at East Tennessee State	L 48–89	5–10 (0–4)	Freedom Hall Civic Center (4,218); Johnson City, TN
January 15; 7:00 pm, ESPN3		at Western Carolina	L 58–65	5–11 (0–5)	Ramsey Center (1,420); Cullowhee, NC
January 18; 7:00 pm, ESPN3		Mercer	L 56–62	5–12 (0–6)	Cameron Hall (961); Lexington, VA
January 20; 1:00 pm, ESPN3		The Citadel	W 88–81	6–12 (1–6)	Cameron Hall (3,500); Lexington, VA
January 24; 7:00 pm		Wofford	L 46–63	6–13 (1–7)	Cameron Hall (882); Lexington, VA
January 27; 5:00 pm, ESPN3		at Chattanooga	W 70–69	7–13 (2–7)	McKenzie Arena (4,778); Chattanooga, TN
January 29; 8:00 pm		at Samford	L 79–93	7–14 (2–8)	Pete Hanna Center (1,006); Homewood, AL
February 1; 7:00 pm, ESPN3		at UNC Greensboro	L 51–73	7–15 (2–9)	Greensboro Coliseum (2,572); Greensboro, NC
February 8; 7:00 pm, ESPN3		Western Carolina	L 60–72	7–16 (2–10)	Cameron Hall (1,043); Lexington, VA
February 10; 1:00 pm, ESPN3		East Tennessee State	L 56–70	7–17 (2–11)	Cameron Hall (3,253); Lexington, VA
February 15; 7:00 pm, ESPN3		at Mercer	L 58–82	7–18 (2–12)	Hawkins Arena (2,702); Macon, GA
February 17; 1:00 pm, ESPN3		at The Citadel	W 75–71	8–18 (3–12)	McAlister Field House (3,213); Charleston, SC
February 20; 7:00 pm, ESPN3		at Furman	L 54–76	8–19 (3–13)	Timmons Arena (1,403); Greenville, SC
February 23; 7:00 pm		Samford	L 82–89	8–20 (3–14)	Cameron Hall (2,899); Lexington, VA
February 25; 1:00 pm, ESPN3		Chattanooga	W 68–65	9–20 (4–14)	Cameron Hall (1,147); Lexington, VA
Southern Conference tournament
March 2; 5:00 pm, ESPN3	(9)	vs. (8) The Citadel; First round	L 70–78	9–21	U.S. Cellular Center (2,138); Asheville, NC
*Non-conference game. (#) Tournament seedings in parentheses. All times are in Eastern Time; Source.
