= 2017–18 Western Carolina Catamounts men's basketball team =

American college basketball season

2017–18 Western Carolina Catamounts men's basketball
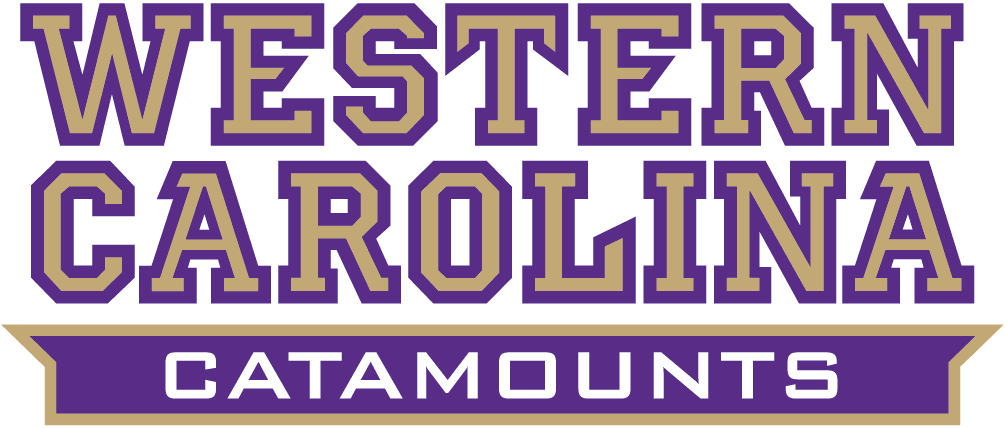
- Conference: Southern Conference
- Record: 13–19 (8–10 SoCon)
- Head coach: Larry Hunter (13th season)
- Assistant coaches: Anquell McCollum; Brigham Waginger; Wilie Freeman
- Home arena: Ramsey Center

2017–18 Southern Conference men's basketball standings
	Conf.				Overall
Team	W		L	PCT	W		L	PCT
UNC Greensboro †	15	–	3	.833	27	–	8	.771
East Tennessee State	14	–	4	.778	25	–	9	.735
Furman	13	–	5	.722	23	–	10	.697
Mercer	11	–	7	.611	19	–	15	.559
Wofford	11	–	7	.611	21	–	13	.618
Western Carolina	8	–	10	.444	13	–	19	.406
Samford	6	–	12	.333	10	–	22	.313
The Citadel	5	–	13	.278	11	–	21	.344
VMI	4	–	14	.222	9	–	21	.300
Chattanooga	3	–	15	.167	10	–	23	.303
† 2018 SoCon Tournament winner

The 2017–18 Western Carolina Catamounts men's basketball team represented Western Carolina University during the 2017–18 NCAA Division I men's basketball season. The Catamounts, led by 13th-year head coach Larry Hunter, played their home games at the Ramsey Center in Cullowhee, North Carolina as members of the Southern Conference (SoCon). They finished the season 13–19, 8–10 in SoCon play, to finish in sixth place. They lost in the quarterfinals of the Southern Conference tournament to Furman.

Following the loss to Furman, Larry Hunter resigned as head coach. He finished his coaching career at Western Carolina with a record of 193–229 over 13 seasons. Winthrop associate head coach Mark Prosser, son of the late Skip Prosser, was named Hunter's successor.

== Previous season ==
The Catamounts finished the 2016–17 season 9–23, 4–14 in SoCon play, to finish in a tie for eighth place. They lost in the first round of the Southern Conference tournament to The Citadel.

== Offseason ==
=== Player departures ===
Name	Pos.	Height	Year	Hometown	Reason for departure
Kyle Rhoades	F	6'6"	Senior	Lumberton, NC	Graduated
Elijah Pughsley	G	6'1"	Sophomore	Lima, OH	Transferred to Saginaw Valley State
Jesse Deloach	G	6'7"	Sophomore	Grayson, GA	Transferred to Columbus State

=== Recruiting Class of 2017 ===
College recruiting information
Name	Hometown	School	Height	Weight	Commit date
Desmond Johnson; G	Memphis, TN	Kirby High School	5 ft 11 in (1.80 m)	170 lb (77 kg)	
Desmond Johnson; G	Recruit ratings: No ratings found				
Matt Halvorsen; G	Kingsport, TN	Christ School (N.C.)	6 ft 1 in (1.85 m)	183 lb (83 kg)	
Matt Halvorsen; G	Recruit ratings: No ratings found				
Marcus Thomas; G	Mint Hill, NC	Moravian Prep	6 ft 3 in (1.91 m)	185 lb (84 kg)	
Marcus Thomas; G	Recruit ratings: No ratings found				
Overall recruit ranking:
Note: In many cases, Scout, Rivals, 247Sports, On3, and ESPN may conflict in their listings of height and weight.; In these cases, the average was taken. ESPN grades are on a 100-point scale.; Sources:

=== Incoming transfers ===
Name	Pos.	Height	Weight	Year	Hometown	Previous School	Years Remaining	Notes
Mike Amius	F	6'7"	210	Junior	Lake Worth, FL	North Platte College	2	Eligible immediately

== Roster ==
2017–18 Western Carolina Catamounts men's basketball team
Players
Coaches

Pos.	#	Name	Height	Weight	Year	Hometown
G	0	Maurice Smith	6 ft 6 in (1.98 m)	215 lb (98 kg)	So	Lauderdale Lakes, FL
G	1	Desmond Johnson	5 ft 11 in (1.8 m)	170 lb (77 kg)	Fr	Memphis, TN
G	2	Matt Halvorsen	6 ft 1 in (1.85 m)	170 lb (77 kg)	Fr	Kingsport, TN
G	3	Jason McMillan	5 ft 11 in (1.8 m)	165 lb (75 kg)	So	Cherokee, NC
G	5	Devin Peterson	6 ft 1 in (1.85 m)	175 lb (79 kg)	Sr	Milton, GA
G	11	Haboubacar Mutombo	6 ft 5 in (1.96 m)	190 lb (86 kg)	RS Sr	Pickering, ON
F	12	Marc Gosselin	6 ft 7 in (2.01 m)	205 lb (93 kg)	Jr	Lyon, France
G	13	Deriece Parks	6 ft 5 in (1.96 m)	155 lb (70 kg)	RS Sr	Charlotte, NC
G	21	Marcus Thomas	6 ft 3 in (1.91 m)	180 lb (82 kg)	Fr	Mint Hill, NC
F	23	Mike Amius	6 ft 7 in (2.01 m)	210 lb (95 kg)	Jr	Lake Worth, FL
F	24	Ashley Williams	6 ft 5 in (1.96 m)	175 lb (79 kg)	Sr	Morehead City, NC
G	32	Devonte Fuller	6 ft 1 in (1.85 m)	185 lb (84 kg)	RS Sr	Hickory, NC
F	33	Onno Steger	6 ft 5 in (1.96 m)	205 lb (93 kg)	So	Upper Arlington, OH
F	35	Yalim Olcay	6 ft 8 in (2.03 m)	225 lb (102 kg)	So	İzmir, Turkey
F	41	Charlendez Brooks	6 ft 9 in (2.06 m)	240 lb (109 kg)	RS Sr	Duncan, SC
F	44	Adam Sledd	6 ft 8 in (2.03 m)	220 lb (100 kg)	So	Roanoke, VA

Head coach

- Larry Hunter (Ohio)

Assistant coach(es)

- Anquell McCollum (Western Carolina)
- Brigham Waginger (Western Carolina)
- Willie Freeman (Western Carolina)

Legend

- (C) Team captain
- (S) Suspended
- (I) Ineligible
- (W) Walk-on
- Injured
- Current redshirt

Roster
Last update: July 8, 2024

== Schedule and results ==
Date time, TV	Rank^{#}	Opponent^{#}	Result	Record	Site (attendance) city, state
Regular season
November 10, 2017*; 7:00 p.m., ACCN Extra		at Clemson	L 57–85	0–1	Littlejohn Coliseum (8,188); Clemson, SC
November 13, 2017*; 7:00 p.m., ESPN3		at No. 12 Cincinnati	L 51–102	0–2	BB&T Arena (7,051); Highland Heights, KY
November 15, 2017*; 7:00 p.m.		Hiwassee	W 76–57	1–2	Ramsey Center (982); Cullowhee, NC
November 19, 2017*; 4:30 p.m., FS1		at No. 14 Minnesota; Barclays Center Classic	L 64–92	1–3	Williams Arena (11,107); Minneapolis, MN
November 21, 2017*; 7:00 p.m.		at Massachusetts; Barclays Center Classic	L 76–85	1–4	William D. Mullins Memorial Center (2,042); Amherst, MA
November 24, 2017*; 7:00 p.m.		vs. UT Arlington; Barclays Center Classic	L 65–98	1–5	Gallagher Center (842); Lewiston, NY
November 25, 2017*; 4:00 p.m.		vs. Alabama A&M; Barclays Center Classic	W 82–72	2–5	Gallagher Center (809); Lewiston, NY
November 30, 2017*; 7:00 p.m.		at College of Charleston	L 60–69	2–6	TD Arena (3,889); Charleston, SC
December 4, 2017*; 7:00 p.m., ESPN3		Appalachian State	W 72–71	3–6	Ramsey Center (3,303); Cullowhee, NC
December 6, 2017*; 7:00 p.m., ESPN2		at No. 11 North Carolina	L 61–104	3–7	Dean Smith Center (12,720); Chapel Hill, NC
December 17, 2017*; 7:00 p.m.		vs. UNC Asheville; Mountain Invitational	W 76–72	4–7	U.S. Cellular Center (1,423); Asheville, NC
December 19, 2017*; 7:00 p.m., ESPN3		High Point	L 61–72	4–8	Ramsey Center (1,011); Cullowhee, NC
December 30, 2017; 1:00 p.m., ESPN3		at The Citadel	W 81–79	5–8 (1–0)	McAlister Field House (546); Charleston, SC
January 4, 2018; 7:30 p.m., ESPN3		at Chattanooga	W 75–63	6–8 (2–0)	McKenzie Arena (3,844); Chattanooga, TN
January 6, 2018; 8:00 p.m., ESPN3		at Samford	L 71–85	6–9 (1–1)	Pete Hanna Center; Homewood, AL
January 10, 2018; 7:00 p.m., ESPN3		Mercer	W 58–56	7–9 (3–1)	Ramsey Center (834); Cullowhee, NC
January 13, 2018; 7:30 p.m., ESPN3		UNC Greensboro	L 55–66	7–10 (3–2)	Ramsey Center (1,237); Cullowhee, NC
January 15, 2018; 7:00 p.m., ESPN3		VMI	W 65–58	8–10 (4–2)	Ramsey Center (1,420); Cullowhee, NC
January 20, 2018; 4:00 p.m., ESPN3		at East Tennessee State	L 50–66	8–11 (4–3)	Freedom Hall Civic Center (5,412); Johnson City, TN
January 25, 2018*; 7:00 p.m.		Southern Wesleyan	W 108–48	9–11	Ramsey Center (956); Cullowhee, NC
January 27, 2018; 4:00 p.m., ESPN3		at Furman	L 66–100	9–12 (4–4)	Timmons Arena (1,812); Greenville, SC
January 29, 2018; 7:00 p.m., Stadium		at Wofford	L 68–77	9–13 (4–5)	Jerry Richardson Indoor Stadium (1,785); Spartanburg, SC
February 1, 2018; 7:30 p.m., ESPN3		Chattanooga	W 70–68	10–13 (5–5)	Ramsey Center (1,109); Cullowhee, NC
February 3, 2018; 7:30 p.m., ESPN3		Samford	W 88–71	11–13 (6–5)	Ramsey Center (2,017); Cullowhee, NC
February 8, 2018; 7:00 p.m., ESPN3		at VMI	W 72–60	12–13 (7–5)	Cameron Hall (1,043); Lexington, VA
February 10, 2018; 5:00 p.m., ESPN3		at UNC Greensboro	L 48–65	12–14 (7–6)	Fleming Gymnasium (1,983); Greensboro, NC
February 15, 2018; 7:30 p.m., ESPN3		Wofford	L 69–84	12–15 (7–7)	Ramsey Center (1,121); Cullowhee, NC
February 17, 2018; 7:30 p.m., ESPN3		East Tennessee State	L 61–72	12–16 (7–8)	Ramsey Center (1,836); Cullowhee, NC
February 20, 2018; 7:00 p.m., ESPN3		at Mercer	L 64–81	12–17 (7–9)	Hawkins Arena (3,572); Macon, GA
February 23, 2018; 7:00 p.m., ESPN3		Furman	L 55–78	12–18 (7–10)	Ramsey Center (1,386); Cullowhee, NC
February 25, 2018; 2:00 p.m., ESPN3		The Citadel	W 92–75	13–18 (8–10)	Ramsey Center (1,236); Cullowhee, NC
SoCon tournament
March 3, 2017; 6:00 p.m., ESPN3	(6)	vs. (3) Furman; Quarterfinals	L 73–97	13–19	U.S. Cellular Center (5,431); Asheville, NC
*Non-conference game. ^{#}Rankings from AP poll. (#) Tournament seedings in parentheses. All times are in Eastern.
