= 2017–18 Mercer Bears men's basketball team =

American college basketball season

2017–18 Mercer Bears men's basketball

CBI, Quarterfinals
- Conference: Southern Conference
- Record: 19–15 (11–7 SoCon)
- Head coach: Bob Hoffman (10th season)
- Assistant coaches: Dale Layer; Jarred Merrill; Jason Eaker
- Home arena: Hawkins Arena

2017–18 Southern Conference men's basketball standings
	Conf.				Overall
Team	W		L	PCT	W		L	PCT
UNC Greensboro †	15	–	3	.833	27	–	8	.771
East Tennessee State	14	–	4	.778	25	–	9	.735
Furman	13	–	5	.722	23	–	10	.697
Mercer	11	–	7	.611	19	–	15	.559
Wofford	11	–	7	.611	21	–	13	.618
Western Carolina	8	–	10	.444	13	–	19	.406
Samford	6	–	12	.333	10	–	22	.313
The Citadel	5	–	13	.278	11	–	21	.344
VMI	4	–	14	.222	9	–	21	.300
Chattanooga	3	–	15	.167	10	–	23	.303
† 2018 SoCon Tournament winner

The 2017–18 Mercer Bears men's basketball team represented Mercer University during the 2017–18 NCAA Division I men's basketball season. The Bears, led by tenth-year head coach Bob Hoffman, played their home games at Hawkins Arena on the university's Macon, Georgia campus as fourth-year members of the Southern Conference. They finished the season 19–15, 11–7 in SoCon play to finish in a tie for fourth place. They lost in the quarterfinals of the SoCon tournament to Wofford. They were invited to the College Basketball Invitational where they defeated Grand Canyon in the first round before losing in the quarterfinals to North Texas.

== Previous season ==
The Bears finished the 2016–17 season 15–17, 9–9 in SoCon play to finish in sixth place. They lost in the quarterfinals of the SoCon tournament to East Tennessee State.

== Roster ==
2017–18 Mercer Bears men's basketball team
Players
Coaches

Pos.	#	Name	Height	Weight	Year	Hometown
F	0	Desmond Ringer	6 ft 9 in (2.06 m)	255 lb (116 kg)	RS Sr	McDonough, Georgia
F	1	Cory Kilby	6 ft 7 in (2.01 m)	195 lb (88 kg)	Jr	Ada, Oklahoma
G	2	Jaylen Stowe	6 ft 2 in (1.88 m)	200 lb (91 kg)	RS Jr	Harrisburg, North Carolina
G	3	Marcus Cohen	6 ft 4 in (1.93 m)	180 lb (82 kg)	Fr	Tampa, Florida
G	5	Jordan Strawberry	6 ft 1 in (1.85 m)	175 lb (79 kg)	Sr	Anaheim, California
G	10	Ria'n Holland	6 ft 0 in (1.83 m)	152 lb (69 kg)	Sr	Fayetteville, North Carolina
G	11	Ryan Johnson	6 ft 5 in (1.96 m)	192 lb (87 kg)	RS Jr	Greensboro, North Carolina
G	12	Mitch Prendergast	6 ft 1 in (1.85 m)	180 lb (82 kg)	RS Fr	Dallas, Texas
G	14	Ethan Stair	6 ft 5 in (1.96 m)	205 lb (93 kg)	RS So	Hazel Green, Alabama
G	20	Ross Cummings	6 ft 3 in (1.91 m)	185 lb (84 kg)	So	Dickson, Tennessee
F	21	Mason Green	6 ft 10 in (2.08 m)	220 lb (100 kg)	Fr	Ellenwood, Georgia
G	22	Carson Heinen	6 ft 2 in (1.88 m)	—	Fr	Gainesville, Georgia
F	23	Demetre Rivers	6 ft 8 in (2.03 m)	180 lb (82 kg)	Sr	Ladson, South Carolina
G	25	Rashad Lewis	5 ft 8 in (1.73 m)	156 lb (71 kg)	Sr	Valdosta, Georgia
C	33	Mac Brydon	6 ft 10 in (2.08 m)	260 lb (118 kg)	RS Fr	Charlotte, North Carolina
F	34	Stephon Jelks	6 ft 6 in (1.98 m)	225 lb (102 kg)	RS Sr	Marietta, Georgia
C	50	Victor Baffuto	6 ft 10 in (2.08 m)	220 lb (100 kg)	RS Fr	Brasília, Brazil

Head coach

- Bob Hoffman (Oklahoma Baptist)

Assistant coach(es)

- Dale Layer (Eckerd)
- Jarred Merrill (Oklahoma Christian)
- Jason Eaker (Texas–Pan American)

Legend

- (C) Team captain
- (S) Suspended
- (I) Ineligible
- (W) Walk-on
- Injured
- Current redshirt

Roster
Last update: December 29, 2017

== Schedule and results ==
Date time, TV	Rank^{#}	Opponent^{#}	Result	Record	Site (attendance) city, state
Non-conference regular season
Nov 10, 2017*; 8:00 pm, ESPN3		at UCF	L 79–88	0–1	CFE Arena (6,167); Orlando, FL
Nov 12, 2017*; 2:00 pm, ESPN3		Toccoa Falls	W 110–43	1–1	Hawkins Arena (2,381); Macon, GA
Nov 14, 2017*; 7:00 pm, ESPN3		Jackson State	W 86–58	2–1	Hawkins Arena (2,742); Macon, GA
Nov 17, 2017*; 12:00 pm		at Liberty; Paradise Jam quarterfinals	W 63–48	3–1	Vines Center (1,022); Lynchburg, VA
Nov 18, 2017*; 6:00 pm		vs. Drexel; Paradise Jam semifinals	W 78–59	4–1	Vines Center (534); Lynchburg, VA
Nov 19, 2017*; 8:30 pm		vs. Colorado; Paradise Jam championship	L 70–79	4–2	Vines Center (568); Lynchburg, VA
Nov 26, 2017*; 2:00 pm, ESPN3		Hiwassee	W 90–53	5–2	Hawkins Arena (2,344); Macon, GA
Nov 29, 2017*; 7:00 pm, SECN		at Tennessee	L 60–84	5–3	Thompson–Boling Arena (13,642); Knoxville, TN
Dec 2, 2017*; 5:00 pm, ESPN3		at Memphis	L 81–83 ^{2OT}	5–4	FedExForum (4,113); Memphis, TN
Dec 9, 2017*; 4:00 pm, ESPN3		Florida A&M	W 82–64	6–4	Hawkins Arena (3,226); Macon, GA
Dec 17, 2017*; 4:30 pm		at La Salle	L 85–95	6–5	Tom Gola Arena (1,251); Philadelphia, PA
Dec 19, 2017*; 9:00 pm, SECN		vs. Alabama; Rocket City Classic	L 79–80	6–6	Von Braun Center (4,799); Huntsville, AL
Dec 28, 2017*; 7:00 pm, ESPN3		Kennesaw State	W 89–56	7–6	Hawkins Arena (3,513); Macon, GA
SoCon regular season
Dec 31, 2017; 2:00 pm, ESPN3		East Tennessee State	L 55–74	7–7 (0–1)	Hawkins Arena (3,069); Macon, GA
Jan 6, 2018; 4:30 pm, ESPN3		at Furman	L 71–74	7–8 (0–2)	Timmons Arena (2,002); Greenville, SC
Jan 10, 2018; 7:00 pm, ESPN3		at Western Carolina	L 56–58	7–9 (0–3)	Ramsey Center (834); Cullowhee, NC
Jan 13, 2018; 4:00 pm, ESPN3		Samford	W 81–50	8–9 (1–3)	Hawkins Arena (3,527); Macon, GA
Jan 15, 2018; 7:00 pm, Stadium		Chattanooga	W 75–71 ^{OT}	9–9 (2–3)	Hawkins Arena (3,476); Macon, GA
Jan 18, 2018; 7:00 pm, ESPN3		at VMI	W 62–56	10–9 (3–3)	Cameron Hall (961); Lexington, VA
Jan 20, 2018; 5:00 pm, ESPN3		at UNC Greensboro	L 66–70 ^{OT}	10–10 (3–4)	Greensboro Coliseum (2,874); Greensboro, NC
Jan 24, 2018; 7:00 pm		at East Tennessee State	L 75–84	10–11 (3–5)	Freedom Hall Civic Center (4,770); Johnson City, TN
Jan 27, 2018; 4:00 pm, ESPN3		The Citadel	L 74–76	10–12 (3–6)	Hawkins Arena (2,972); Macon, GA
Feb 1, 2018; 7:30 pm, ESPN3		Furman	L 73–85	10–13 (3–7)	Hawkins Arena (2,772); Macon, GA
Feb 3, 2018; 4:30 pm, ESPN3		Wofford	W 73–65	11–13 (4–7)	Hawkins Arena (3,267); Macon, GA
Feb 10, 2018; 5:00 pm		at Chattanooga	W 84–75	12–13 (5–7)	McKenzie Arena (4,380); Chattanooga, TN
Feb 12, 2018; 8:00 pm		at Samford	W 74–69	13–13 (6–7)	Pete Hanna Center (1,365); Homewood, AL
Feb 15, 2018; 7:00 pm, ESPN3		VMI	W 82–58	14–13 (7–7)	Hawkins Arena (2,702); Macon, GA
Feb 17, 2018; 4:00 pm, ESPN3		UNC Greensboro	W 77–74	15–13 (8–7)	Hawkins Arena (2,899); Macon, GA
Feb 20, 2018; 7:00 pm, ESPN3		Western Carolina	W 81–64	16–13 (9–7)	Hawkins Arena (3,572); Macon, GA
Feb 23, 2018; 6:00 pm, ESPN3		at The Citadel	W 83–70	17–13 (10–7)	McAlister Field House (737); Charleston, SC
Feb 25, 2018; 7:00 pm, ESPN3		at Wofford	W 69–68	18–13 (11–7)	Jerry Richardson Indoor Stadium (1,930); Spartanburg, SC
SoCon tournament
Mar 3, 2018; 2:30 pm, ESPN3	(4)	vs. (5) Wofford; Quarterfinals	L 53–73	18–14	U.S. Cellular Center (4,863); Asheville, NC
CBI
Mar 14, 2018*; 10:00 pm, ESPN3		at Grand Canyon; First round	W 78–73	19–14	GCU Arena (5,941); Phoenix, AZ
Mar 19, 2018*; 8:00 pm, ESPN3		at North Texas; Quarterfinals	L 67–96	19–15	The Super Pit (1,145); Denton, TX
*Non-conference game. ^{#}Rankings from AP Poll. (#) Tournament seedings in parentheses. All times are in Eastern Time.
