= 2017–18 North Texas Mean Green men's basketball team =

American college basketball season

2017–18 North Texas Mean Green men's basketball
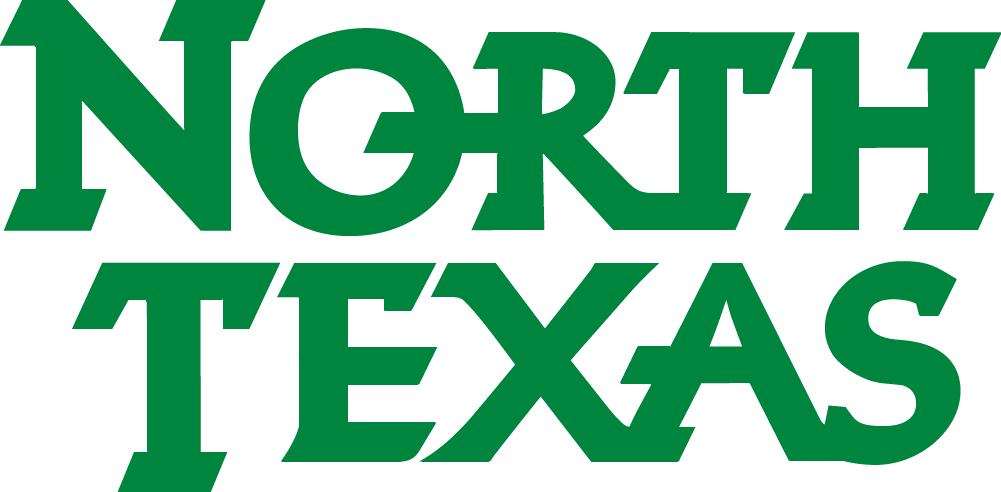

CBI champions
- Conference: Conference USA
- Record: 20–18 (8–10 C-USA)
- Head coach: Grant McCasland (1st season)
- Assistant coaches: Ross Hodge; James Miller; Jareem Dowling
- Home arena: The Super Pit

2017–18 Conference USA men's basketball standings
	Conf.				Overall
Team	W		L	PCT	W		L	PCT
Middle Tennessee	16	–	2	.889	25	–	8	.758
Old Dominion	15	–	3	.833	25	–	7	.781
Western Kentucky	14	–	4	.778	27	–	11	.711
Marshall †	12	–	6	.667	25	–	11	.694
UTSA	11	–	7	.611	20	–	15	.571
UAB	10	–	8	.556	20	–	13	.606
North Texas	8	–	10	.444	20	–	18	.526
FIU	8	–	10	.444	14	–	18	.438
Southern Miss	7	–	11	.389	16	–	18	.471
Louisiana Tech	7	–	11	.389	17	–	16	.515
Florida Atlantic	6	–	12	.333	12	–	19	.387
UTEP	6	–	12	.333	11	–	20	.355
Rice	4	–	14	.222	7	–	24	.226
Charlotte	2	–	16	.111	6	–	23	.207
† 2018 C-USA Tournament winner

The 2017–18 North Texas Mean Green men's basketball team represented the University of North Texas during the 2017–18 NCAA Division I men's basketball season. The Mean Green, led by first-year head coach Grant McCasland, played their home games at UNT Coliseum, nicknamed The Super Pit, in Denton, Texas, as members of Conference USA. They finished the season 20–18, 8–10 in C-USA play to finish in a tie for seventh place. They lost in the first round of the C-USA tournament to Louisiana Tech. They were invited to participate in the College Basketball Invitational where they defeated South Dakota, Mercer, and Jacksonville State to advance to the best-of-three finals series against San Francisco. After losing in game 1, they won games 2 and 3 to become CBI champions. They also had the biggest crowd since 2010 at 6,291.

== Previous season ==
The Mean Green finished the 2016–17 season 8–22, 2–16 in C-USA play to finish in last place. They failed to qualify for the C-USA tournament.

On March 5, 2017, the school fired head coach Tony Benford after five years without a winning season. On March 13, the school hired Arkansas State head coach Grant McCasland as head coach.

== Departures ==
Name	Number	Pos.	Height	Weight	Year	Hometown	Reason for departure
Jeremy Combs	1	F	6'7"	215	Junior	Dallas, TX	Graduate transferred to LSU
Greg White-Pittman	2	G	6'2"	205	Junior	New Orleans, LA	Transferred
Ja'Michael Brown	3	G	6'1"	180	Sophomore	Raceland, LA	Transferred to Angelo State
Keith Frazier	4	G	6'5"	190	Senior	Dallas, TX	Graduate transferred to UTEP
Deckie Johnson	10	G	6'4"	180	Senior	Memphis, TN	Graduated
Derail Green	11	F	6'7"	220	RS Senior	Houston, TX	Graduated
Rickey Brice Jr.	23	C	7'1"	270	Sophomore	Arlington, TX	Graduate transferred to Texas A&M–Commerce
Jacob Gross	24	G	6'4"	191	RS Junior	Sachse, TX	Walk-on; left the team for personal reasons
J-Mychael Reese	52	G	6'2"	185	RS Junior	Bryan, TX	Graduate transferred

=== Incoming transfers ===
Name	Number	Pos.	Height	Weight	Year	Hometown	Previous School
Jorden Duffy	2	G	6'0"		RS Sophomore	Salisbury, MD	Junior college transferred from San Jacinto College
Roosevelt Smart	3	G	6'3"	170	Sophomore	Palatine, IL	Junior college transferred from New Mexico JC
Jahmiah Simmons	10	F	6'4"	205	Sophomore	Saint Thomas, Virgin Islands	Transferred from Arkansas State. Under NCAA transfer rules, Simmons will have to sit out for the 2017–18 season. Will have three years of remaining eligibility.
Tope Arikawe	20	F	6'8"	220	Junior	Lagos, Nigeria	Junior college transferred from Panola College
Michael Miller	23	G	6'3"		Junior	Michigan City, IN	Junior college transferred from Shawnee CC

== Recruiting class of 2017 ==
College recruiting
Name	Hometown	School	Height	Weight	Commit date
Mark Tikhonenko; PF	Moscow, Russia	Mount Zion Preparatory School	6 ft 10 in (2.08 m)	210 lb (95 kg)	Mar 30, 2017
Mark Tikhonenko; PF	Recruit ratings: Scout: Rivals: (0)				
Umoja Gibson; PG	Waco, TX	University High School	6 ft 1 in (1.85 m)	165 lb (75 kg)	Jun 26, 2016
Umoja Gibson; PG	Recruit ratings: Scout: Rivals: (0)				
Zach Simmons; PF	Cedar Hill, TX	Cedar Hill High School	6 ft 9 in (2.06 m)	235 lb (107 kg)	Sep 30, 2016
Zach Simmons; PF	Recruit ratings: Scout: Rivals: (0)				
Overall recruit ranking:
Note: In many cases, Scout, Rivals, 247Sports, On3, and ESPN may conflict in their listings of height and weight.; In these cases, the average was taken. ESPN grades are on a 100-point scale.; Sources: "2017 Team Ranking". Rivals.

== Roster ==
2017–18 North Texas Mean Green men's basketball team
Players
Coaches

Pos.	#	Name	Height	Weight	Year	Previous school	Hometown
G	0	Ryan Woolridge	6 ft 3 in (1.91 m)	175 lb (79 kg)	RS So	Lake Ridge HS; San Diego	Mansfield, TX
G	1	A. J. Lawson	6 ft 5 in (1.96 m)	195 lb (88 kg)	So	Bryan HS	Bryan, TX
G	2	Jorden Duffy	6 ft 1 in (1.85 m)	170 lb (77 kg)	Jr	James M. Bennett HS; San Jacinto College	Salisbury, MD
G	3	Roosevelt Smart	6 ft 3 in (1.91 m)	185 lb (84 kg)	So	Sunrise Christian Academy; New Mexico JC	Chicago, IL
G	4	Umoja Gibson	6 ft 1 in (1.85 m)	160 lb (73 kg)	Fr	University HS	Waco, TX
G	5	Allante Holston	6 ft 7 in (2.01 m)	190 lb (86 kg)	Jr	Clinton Christian School	Capitol Heights, MD
F	10	Jahmiah Simmons (redshirt)	6 ft 4 in (1.93 m)	205 lb (93 kg)	So	Pace HS; Arkansas State	St. Thomas, Virgin Islands
F	14	Bryce Jackson (W)	6 ft 6 in (1.98 m)	210 lb (95 kg)	Sr	Fossil Ridge HS; New Orleans	Keller, TX
F	20	Tope Arikawe	6 ft 8 in (2.03 m)	220 lb (100 kg)	Jr	Covenant Christian; Panola College	Lagos, Nigeria
F	22	Khalil Fuller	6 ft 8 in (2.03 m)	260 lb (118 kg)	RS So	Rancho Verde HS	Moreno Valley, CA
G	23	Michael Miller	6 ft 3 in (1.91 m)	170 lb (77 kg)	Jr	Michigan City HS; Shawnee CC	Michigan City, IN
F	24	Zachary Simmons	6 ft 9 in (2.06 m)	235 lb (107 kg)	Fr	Cedar Hill HS	Abilene, TX
F	50	Shane Temara	6 ft 9 in (2.06 m)	225 lb (102 kg)	Sr	West Genesee HS; Angelina College	Syracuse, NY
G	55	D. J. Draper (W)	5 ft 10 in (1.78 m)	165 lb (75 kg)	RS So	Birdville HS	Beford, TX

Head coach

- Grant McCasland (Baylor)

Assistant coach(es)

- Ross Hodge (East Texas A&M)
- James Miller (Arizona State)
- Jareem Dowling (Maryland Eastern Shore)

Legend

- (C) Team captain
- (S) Suspended
- (I) Ineligible
- (W) Walk-on
- Injured
- Current redshirt

Roster

== Schedule and results ==
Date time, TV	Rank^{#}	Opponent^{#}	Result	Record	Site (attendance) city, state
Non-conference regular season
Nov 10, 2017*; 5:00 pm		Eureka	W 122–65	1–0	The Super Pit (3,252); Denton, TX
Nov 13, 2017*; 7:00 pm, BTN Plus		at Nebraska	L 67–86	1–1	Pinnacle Bank Arena (9,028); Lincoln, NE
Nov 16, 2017*; 7:00 pm		Bethune–Cookman; Ramblin' Wreck Showcase	W 90–78	2–1	The Super Pit (2,013); Denton, TX
Nov 20, 2017*; 7:00 pm		Texas–Rio Grande Valley; Ramblin' Wreck Showcase	L 63–75	2–2	The Super Pit (1,892); Denton, TX
Nov 22, 2017*; 7:00 pm		Rogers State	W 88–74	3–2	The Super Pit (1,678); Denton, TX
Nov 24, 2017*; 3:00 pm, RSN		at Georgia Tech; Ramblin' Wreck Showcase	L 49–63	3–3	McCamish Pavilion (4,867); Atlanta, GA
Nov 27, 2017*; 7:00 pm		Grambling State; Ramblin' Wreck Showcase	W 82–77	4–3	The Super Pit (1,513); Denton, TX
Nov 30, 2017*; 7:00 pm, SSTV/FSOK		at Oklahoma	L 72–82	4–4	Lloyd Noble Center (8,132); Norman, OK
Dec 2, 2017*; 7:00 pm		at Texas–Arlington	L 60–65	4–5	College Park Center (2,728); Arlington, TX
Dec 6, 2017*; 7:00 pm		at Indiana State	W 79–76 ^{OT}	5–5	The Super Pit (1,642); Denton, TX
Dec 9, 2017*; 5:00 pm		at McNeese State	W 85–47	6–5	The Super Pit (1,612); Denton, TX
Dec 16, 2017*; 9:00 pm		at San Diego	W 86–83 ^{OT}	7–5	Jenny Craig Pavilion (1,419); San Diego, CA
Dec 20, 2017*; 6:00 pm, FS2		at Georgetown	L 63–75	7–6	Capital One Arena (4,226); Washington, D.C.
Conference USA regular season
Dec 28, 2017; 8:00 pm		at UTEP	W 63–62	8–6 (1–0)	Don Haskins Center (6,306); El Paso, TX
Dec 30, 2017; 7:00 pm		at UTSA	W 72–71	9–6 (2–0)	Convocation Center (1,130); San Antonio, TX
Jan 4, 2018; 7:00 pm		Charlotte	L 68–70	9–7 (2–1)	The Super Pit (1,826); Denton, TX
Jan 6, 2018; 5:00 pm		Old Dominion	L 60–63	9–8 (2–2)	The Super Pit (1,907); Denton, TX
Jan 13, 2018; 2:00 pm		at Rice	W 85–78	10–8 (3–2)	Tudor Fieldhouse (2,487); Houston, TX
Jan 18, 2018; 6:00 pm, Stadium		at Louisiana Tech	L 65–66	10–9 (3–3)	Thomas Assembly Center (4,236); Ruston, LA
Jan 20, 2018; 4:00 pm		at Southern Miss	L 78–85	10–10 (3–4)	Reed Green Coliseum (2,540); Hattiesburg, MS
Jan 25, 2018; 7:00 pm, ESPN3		Florida Atlantic	W 59–53	11–10 (4–4)	The Super Pit (1,952); Denton, TX
Jan 27, 2018; 5:00 pm		FIU	W 69–67 ^{OT}	12–10 (5–4)	The Super Pit (2,096); Denton, TX
Feb 3, 2018; 2:00 pm, ESPN3		Rice	W 74–70	13–10 (6–4)	The Super Pit (2,322); Denton, TX
Feb 8, 2018; 7:00 pm		at UAB	W 67–60	14–10 (7–4)	Bartow Arena (3,383); Birmingham, AL
Feb 10, 2018; 5:00 pm		at Middle Tennessee	L 73–79	14–11 (7–5)	Murphy Center (6,209); Murfreesboro, TN
Feb 15, 2018; 8:00 pm, Stadium		Western Kentucky	L 94–102 ^{OT}	14–12 (7–6)	The Super Pit (2,306); Denton, TX
Feb 17, 2018; 5:00 pm		Marshall	L 72–74	14–13 (7–7)	The Super Pit (4,115); Denton, TX
Feb 22, 2018; 6:00 pm		at FIU	L 68–69	14–14 (7–8)	FIU Arena (2,163); Miami, FL
Feb 24, 2018; 6:00 pm		at Florida Atlantic	L 54–74	14–15 (7–9)	FAU Arena (1,221); Boca Raton, FL
Mar 1, 2018; 7:00 pm		UTSA	W 80–62	15–15 (8–9)	The Super Pit (3,627); Denton, TX
Mar 3, 2018; 7:00 pm		UTEP	L 66–68	15–16 (8–10)	The Super Pit (3,744); Denton, TX
Conference USA tournament
Mar 7, 2018; 8:30 pm, Stadium	(7)	vs. (10) Louisiana Tech; First round	L 62–68	15–17	The Ford Center at The Star; Frisco, TX
CBI
Mar 14, 2018*; 6:00 pm		at South Dakota; First round	W 90–77	16–17	Sanford Coyote Sports Center (1,348); Vermillion
Mar 19, 2018*; 7:00 pm, ESPN3		Mercer; Quarterfinals	W 96–67	17–17	The Super Pit (1,145); Denton, TX
Mar 21, 2018*; 7:00 pm, ESPN3		Jacksonville State; Semifinals	W 90–68	18–17	The Super Pit (2,784); Denton, TX
Mar 26, 2018*; 9:00 pm, ESPNU		at San Francisco; Finals – Game 1	L 62–72	18–18	War Memorial Gymnasium (1,358); San Francisco, CA
Mar 28, 2018*; 7:30 pm, ESPNU		San Francisco; Finals – Game 2	W 69–55	19–18	The Super Pit (4,196); Denton, TX
Mar 30, 2018*; 6:00 pm, ESPNU		San Francisco; Finals – Game 3	W 88–77	20–18	The Super Pit (6,291); Denton, TX
*Non-conference game. (#) Tournament seedings in parentheses. All times are in Central Time.

== See also ==
- 2017–18 North Texas Mean Green women's basketball team
