= 2017–18 Samford Bulldogs men's basketball team =

American college basketball season

2017–18 Samford Bulldogs men's basketball
- Conference: Southern Conference
- Record: 10–22 (6–12 SoCon)
- Head coach: Scott Padgett (4th season)
- Assistant coaches: Jake Headrick; Sidney Ball; Charles Newton
- Home arena: Pete Hanna Center

2017–18 Southern Conference men's basketball standings
| | Conf. | | | | Overall |
| Team | W | | L | PCT | W | | L | PCT |
|---|---|---|---|---|---|---|---|---|
| UNC Greensboro † | 15 | – | 3 | .833 | 27 | – | 8 | .771 |
| East Tennessee State | 14 | – | 4 | .778 | 25 | – | 9 | .735 |
| Furman | 13 | – | 5 | .722 | 23 | – | 10 | .697 |
| Mercer | 11 | – | 7 | .611 | 19 | – | 15 | .559 |
| Wofford | 11 | – | 7 | .611 | 21 | – | 13 | .618 |
| Western Carolina | 8 | – | 10 | .444 | 13 | – | 19 | .406 |
| Samford | 6 | – | 12 | .333 | 10 | – | 22 | .313 |
| The Citadel | 5 | – | 13 | .278 | 11 | – | 21 | .344 |
| VMI | 4 | – | 14 | .222 | 9 | – | 21 | .300 |
| Chattanooga | 3 | – | 15 | .167 | 10 | – | 23 | .303 |
† 2018 SoCon Tournament winner

The 2017–18 Samford Bulldogs men's basketball team represented Samford University during the 2017–18 NCAA Division I men's basketball season. The Bulldogs, led by fourth-year head coach Scott Padgett, played their home games at the Pete Hanna Center in Homewood, Alabama as members of the Southern Conference. They finished the season 10–22, 6–12 in SoCon play to finish in seventh place. They lost in the first round of the SoCon tournament to Chattanooga.

== Previous season ==
The Bulldogs finished the 2016–17 season 20–16, 8–10 in SoCon play to finish in seventh place. They defeated VMI in the first round of the SoCon tournament before losing in the quarterfinals to Furman. They were invited to the CollegeInsider.com Tournament where they defeated Canisius in the first round before losing in the second round to Liberty.

== Roster ==
2017–18 Samford Bulldogs men's basketball team
Players
Coaches

| Pos. | # | Name | Height | Weight | Year | Hometown |
|---|---|---|---|---|---|---|
| PG | 0 | Brandon Austin | 6 ft 5 in (1.96 m) | 200 lb (91 kg) | Jr | Montgomery, Alabama |
| PG | 00 | Christen Cunningham | 6 ft 2 in (1.88 m) | 190 lb (86 kg) | Sr | Georgetown, Kentucky |
| PG | 1 | Kevion Nolan | 6 ft 2 in (1.88 m) | 170 lb (77 kg) | Fr | Anniston, Alabama |
| PG | 2 | Justin Coleman | 5 ft 10 in (1.78 m) | 170 lb (77 kg) | RS Jr | Birmingham, Alabama |
| PG | 3 | Josh Sharkey | 5 ft 10 in (1.78 m) | 170 lb (77 kg) | So | Philadelphia, Pennsylvania |
| G | 4 | Triston Chambers | 6 ft 2 in (1.88 m) | 185 lb (84 kg) | So | Cold Springs, Alabama |
| F | 13 | Eric Adams | 6 ft 7 in (2.01 m) | 215 lb (98 kg) | Sr | Hoover, Alabama |
| G | 14 | Tanner Tapp | 6 ft 2 in (1.88 m) | 190 lb (86 kg) | Jr | Brentwood, Tennessee |
| F | 15 | Stefan Lakić | 6 ft 7 in (2.01 m) | 220 lb (100 kg) | Jr | Višegrad, Bosnia and Herzegovina |
| F | 20 | Alex Thompson | 6 ft 8 in (2.03 m) | 210 lb (95 kg) | RS Sr | Dothan, Alabama |
| G | 22 | Demetrius Denzel-Dyson | 6 ft 5 in (1.96 m) | 205 lb (93 kg) | RS Sr | Covington, Tennessee |
| G | 24 | Gerald Smith | 6 ft 4 in (1.93 m) | 185 lb (84 kg) | Jr | Carbon Hill, Alabama |
| F | 30 | Luke Touliatos | 6 ft 4 in (1.93 m) | 180 lb (82 kg) | Fr | Homewood, Alabama |
| C | 32 | Ruben Guerrero | 7 ft 0 in (2.13 m) | 240 lb (109 kg) | Sr | Marbella, Spain |
| C | 33 | Wyatt Walker | 6 ft 9 in (2.06 m) | 240 lb (109 kg) | Jr | Jacksonville, Florida |
| F | 33 | JT Mumber | 6 ft 7 in (2.01 m) | 205 lb (93 kg) | Fr | Rome, Georgia |
| F/C | 55 | Alex Peters | 6 ft 8 in (2.03 m) | 225 lb (102 kg) | Sr | Mountain Brook, Alabama |

Head coach

- Scott Padgett (Kentucky)

Assistant coach(es)

- Jake Headrick (Montevallo)
- Sidney Ball (UAB)
- Charles Newton (Tennessee Tech)

Legend

- (C) Team captain
- (S) Suspended
- (I) Ineligible
- (W) Walk-on
- Injured
- Current redshirt

Roster
Last update: December 28, 2017

== Schedule and results ==
| Date time, TV | Rank^{#} | Opponent^{#} | Result | Record | Site (attendance) city, state |
Non-conference regular season
| Nov 10, 2017*; 7:00 pm, ESPN3 | | at Arkansas | L 56–95 | 0–1 | Bud Walton Arena (13,407); Fayetteville, AR |
| Nov 13, 2017*; 7:00 pm | | Alabama A&M | W 87–68 | 1–1 | Pete Hanna Center (1,885); Homewood, AL |
| Nov 16, 2017*; 7:00 pm, ESPN3 | | at LSU | L 86–105 | 1–2 | Pete Maravich Assembly Center (7,731); Baton Rouge, LA |
| Nov 19, 2017*; 2:00 pm, ESPN3 | | at Loyola–Chicago; Savannah Invitational | L 67–88 | 1–3 | Joseph J. Gentile Arena (1,289); Chicago, IL |
| Nov 21, 2017*; 7:00 pm, ESPN3 | | at Valparaiso; Savannah Invitational | L 67–88 | 1–4 | Athletics–Recreation Center (2,259); Valparaiso, IN |
| Nov 24, 2017*; 1:00 pm, ESPN3 | | Southeastern Louisiana; Savannah Invitational | L 71–77 | 1–5 | Pete Hanna Center (561); Homewood, AL |
| Nov 26, 2017*; 2:00 pm, ESPN3 | | Mississippi Valley State; Savannah Invitational | W 83–70 | 2–5 | Pete Hanna Center (517); Homewood, AL |
| Dec 3, 2017*; 2:00 pm | | at Jacksonville State | L 58–89 | 2–6 | Pete Mathews Coliseum (2,018); Jacksonville, AL |
| Dec 5, 2017*; 7:00 pm, ESPN3 | | at Memphis | L 64–65 | 2–7 | FedExForum (4,702); Memphis, TN |
| Dec 9, 2017*; 2:00 pm, ESPN3 | | at Clemson | L 59–81 | 2–8 | Littlejohn Coliseum (7,434); Clemson, SC |
| Dec 15, 2017*; 7:00 pm, ESPN3 | | Thomas | W 98–51 | 3–8 | Pete Hanna Center (522); Homewood, AL |
| Dec 18, 2017*; 7:00 pm, ESPN3 | | Asbury | W 99–70 | 4–8 | Pete Hanna Center (956); Homewood, AL |
| Dec 21, 2017*; 6:00 pm, ESPN3 | | at Kennesaw State | L 66–71 | 4–9 | KSU Convocation Center (876); Kennesaw, GA |
SoCon regular season
| Dec 30, 2017; 7:00 pm, ESPN3 | | Chattanooga | W 73–59 | 5–9 (1–0) | Pete Hanna Center (1,067); Homewood, AL |
| Jan 4, 2018; 7:00 pm, ESPN3 | | East Tennessee State | L 72–90 | 5–10 (1–1) | Pete Hanna Center (894); Homewood, AL |
| Jan 6, 2018; 7:00 pm, ESPN3 | | Western Carolina | W 85–71 | 6–10 (2–1) | Pete Hanna Center; Homewood, AL |
| Jan 11, 2018; 5:00 pm, ESPN3 | | at The Citadel | W 107–91 | 7–10 (3–1) | McAlister Field House (323); Charleston, SC |
| Jan 13, 2018; 3:00 pm, ESPN3 | | at Mercer | L 50–81 | 7–11 (3–2) | Hawkins Arena (3,527); Macon, GA |
| Jan 18, 2018; 7:00 pm, ESPN3 | | Wofford | L 89–93 | 7–12 (3–3) | Pete Hanna Center (1,414); Homewood, AL |
| Jan 20, 2018; 3:30 pm, ESPN3 | | at Furman | L 67–78 | 7–13 (3–4) | Timmons Arena (2,211); Greenville, SC |
| Jan 24, 2018; 6:00 pm, ESPN3 | | at Chattanooga | L 71–78 | 7–14 (3–5) | McKenzie Arena (3,069); Chattanooga, TN |
| Jan 27, 2018; 7:00 pm, ESPN3 | | UNC Greensboro | L 82–98 | 7–15 (3–6) | Pete Hanna Center (1,629); Homewood, AL |
| Jan 29, 2018; 7:00 pm, ESPN3 | | VMI | W 93–79 | 8–15 (4–6) | Pete Hanna Center (1,006); Homewood, AL |
| Feb 1, 2018; 6:00 pm, ESPN3 | | at East Tennessee State | L 76–96 | 8–16 (4–7) | Freedom Hall Civic Center (5,019); Johnson City, TN |
| Feb 3, 2018; 6:30 pm, ESPN3 | | at Western Carolina | L 71–88 | 8–17 (4–8) | Ramsey Center (2,017); Cullowhee, NC |
| Feb 7, 2018; 6:00 pm, ESPN3 | | at Wofford | L 1,489 | 8–18 (4–9) | Jerry Richardson Indoor Stadium (1,489); Spartanburg, SC |
| Feb 10, 2018; 7:00 pm, ESPN3 | | The Citadel | W 116–103 | 9–18 (5–9) | Pete Hanna Center (1,544); Homewood, AL |
| Feb 12, 2018; 7:00 pm, ESPN3 | | Mercer | L 69–74 | 9–19 (5–10) | Pete Hanna Center (1,365); Homewood, AL |
| Feb 17, 2018; 1:00 pm, ESPN3 | | Furman | L 79–94 | 9–20 (5–11) | Pete Hanna Center (1,990); Homewood, AL |
| Feb 23, 2018; 6:00 pm, ESPN3 | | at VMI | W 89–82 | 10–20 (6–11) | Cameron Hall (2,899); Lexington, VA |
| Feb 25, 2018; 3:00 pm, ESPN3 | | at UNC Greensboro | L 75–88 | 10–21 (6–12) | Greensboro Coliseum (3,155); Greensboro, NC |
SoCon tournament
| Mar 2, 2018; 6:30 pm, ESPN3 | (7) | vs. (10) Chattanooga; First round | L 79–89 | 10–22 | U.S. Cellular Center (2,138); Asheville, NC |
*Non-conference game. ^{#}Rankings from AP Poll. (#) Tournament seedings in parentheses. All times are in Central Time.
