= 2018 Southern Conference men's basketball tournament =

- Classification: Division I
- Season: 2017–18
- Teams: 10
- Site: U.S. Cellular Center; Asheville, North Carolina
- Champions: UNC Greensboro (2nd title)
- Winning coach: Wes Miller (1st title)
- MVP: Francis Alonso (UNC Greensboro)
- Television: ESPN3, ESPN2

2017–18 Southern Conference men's basketball standings
	Conf.				Overall
Team	W		L	PCT	W		L	PCT
UNC Greensboro †	15	–	3	.833	27	–	8	.771
East Tennessee State	14	–	4	.778	25	–	9	.735
Furman	13	–	5	.722	23	–	10	.697
Mercer	11	–	7	.611	19	–	15	.559
Wofford	11	–	7	.611	21	–	13	.618
Western Carolina	8	–	10	.444	13	–	19	.406
Samford	6	–	12	.333	10	–	22	.313
The Citadel	5	–	13	.278	11	–	21	.344
VMI	4	–	14	.222	9	–	21	.300
Chattanooga	3	–	15	.167	10	–	23	.303
† 2018 SoCon Tournament winner

The 2018 Southern Conference men's basketball tournament was the postseason men's basketball tournament for the Southern Conference for the 2017–18 season. All tournament games were played at the U.S. Cellular Center in Asheville, North Carolina, from March 2 through 5, 2018.

UNC Greensboro defeated East Tennessee State in the championship game to win the tournament and receive the conference's automatic bid to the NCAA tournament.

== Seeds ==
All ten teams in the Southern Conference were eligible to compete in the conference tournament. Teams were seeded by record within the conference, with a tiebreaker system to seed teams with identical conference records. The top six teams received a first-round bye.

Seed	School	Conference	Tiebreaker
1	UNC Greensboro	15–3	
2	East Tennessee State	14–4	
3	Furman	13–5	
4	Mercer	11–7	2–0 vs Wofford
5	Wofford	11–7	0–2 vs Mercer
6	Western Carolina	8–10	
7	Samford	6–11	
8	The Citadel	5–13	
9	VMI	4–14	
10	Chattanooga	3–15	

== Schedule and results ==
Game	Time	Matchup	Score	Television
First round – Friday, March 2
1	5:00 pm	No. 8 The Citadel vs No. 9 VMI	78–70	ESPN3
2	7:30 pm	No. 7 Samford vs No. 10 Chattanooga	79–89	ESPN3
Quarterfinals – Saturday, March 3
3	12:00 pm	No. 1 UNC Greensboro vs No. 8 The Citadel	82–66	ESPN3
4	2:30 pm	No. 4 Mercer vs No. 5 Wofford	53–73	ESPN3
5	6:00 pm	No. 2 East Tennessee State vs No. 10 Chattanooga	81–61	ESPN3
6	8:30 pm	No. 3 Furman vs No. 6 Western Carolina	97–73	ESPN3
Semifinals – Sunday, March 4
7	4:00 pm	No. 1 UNC Greensboro vs No. 5 Wofford	56–55	ESPN3
8	6:30 pm	No. 2 East Tennessee State vs No. 3 Furman	63–52	ESPN3
Final – Monday, March 5
9	9:00 pm	No. 1 UNC Greensboro vs No. 2 East Tennessee State	62–47	ESPN2
*Game times in EST. Rankings denote tournament seed

== Bracket ==
First round March 2 ESPN3
8	The Citadel	78
9	VMI	70
7	Samford	79
10	Chattanooga	89

Quarterfinals; March 3 ESPN3
1	UNC Greensboro	72
8	The Citadel	58
4	Mercer	53
5	Wofford	73
2	East Tennessee State	77
10	Chattanooga	59
3	Furman	97
6	Western Carolina	73

Semifinals; March 4 ESPN3
1	UNC Greensboro	56
5	Wofford	55
2	East Tennessee State	63
3	Furman	52

Championship; March 5 ESPN2
1	UNC Greensboro	62
2	East Tennessee State	47

== See also ==
- 2018 Southern Conference women's basketball tournament
