= Pete Hanna Center =

Sports venue in Homewood, Alabama

- Interactive map of Pete Hanna Center
- Location: Homewood, AL
- Coordinates: 33.4638°N 86.7973°W
- Owner: Samford University
- Operator: Samford University
- Capacity: 4,974
- Surface: Hardwood

Construction
- Groundbreaking: January 16, 2006
- Opened: October 18, 2007
- Cost: $28 million ($43.5 million in 2025 dollars)
- Architect: Stanmar Inc.

Tenant
- Samford Bulldogs

The Pete Hanna Center is the building housing the 4,974-seat Thomas E. and Marla H. Corts Arena on the campus of Samford University in Homewood (a suburb of Birmingham), in the U.S. state of Alabama.

It is home to the Samford Bulldogs basketball and volleyball teams, which previously played in Seibert Hall. The facility opened in October 2007 and is named for Pete Hanna, the owner, president and chief executive officer of Hanna Steel Corporation. The arena is named for Thomas and Marla Corts, former president and first lady of Samford University.

The Pete Hanna Center opened on October 18, 2007, with a lecture by best-selling author Walter Isaacson. The 101,000-square-foot (9,400 m^{2}) Hanna Center seats 5,000 in Corts Arena and is the home to many Samford University commencement ceremonies, as well as playing host to concerts, high school basketball, and conferences. It was for a time a yearly stop from the Harlem Globetrotters. A record crowd of 5,116 watched the Samford men's basketball team take on Davidson College on January 31, 2009. The Hanna Center also contains a workout facility for students, faculty and staff, athletics offices, locker rooms, athletic training and strength and conditioning facilities.

Most recently, the Pete Hanna Center was the host of the 2009 T-Mobile Invitational. The prestigious national high school basketball tournament was played December 29–30, 2009 at the Hanna Center. The Hanna Center is also the host of the yearly Birmingham stop of the World Famous Harlem Globetrotters.

== See also ==
- List of NCAA Division I basketball arenas
