= 2018–19 The Citadel Bulldogs basketball team =

American college basketball season

2018–19 The Citadel Bulldogs basketball
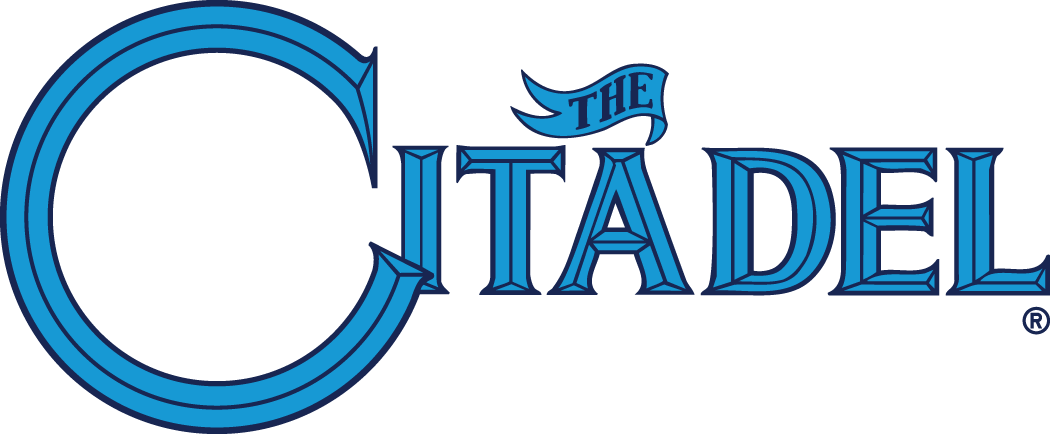
- Conference: Southern Conference
- Record: 12–18 (4–14 SoCon)
- Head coach: Duggar Baucom
- Assistant coaches: Daniel Willis; Willie Bell; Jack Castleberry
- Home arena: McAlister Field House

2018–19 Southern Conference men's basketball standings
	Conf.				Overall
Team	W		L	PCT	W		L	PCT
No. 19 Wofford †	18	–	0	1.000	30	–	5	.857
UNC Greensboro	15	–	3	.833	29	–	7	.806
Furman	13	–	5	.722	25	–	8	.758
East Tennessee State	13	–	5	.722	24	–	10	.706
Chattanooga	7	–	11	.389	12	–	20	.375
Mercer	6	–	12	.333	11	–	20	.355
Samford	6	–	12	.333	17	–	16	.515
VMI	4	–	14	.222	11	–	21	.344
Western Carolina	4	–	14	.222	7	–	25	.219
The Citadel	4	–	14	.222	12	–	18	.400
† 2019 SoCon tournament winner Rankings from AP poll

The 2018–19 The Citadel Bulldogs basketball team represented The Citadel, The Military College of South Carolina in the 2018–19 NCAA Division I men's basketball season. The Bulldogs, led by fourth-year head coach Duggar Baucom, played their home games at McAlister Field House as members of the Southern Conference (SoCon), as they have since 1936–37. The Bulldogs finished the season 12–18, 4–14 in SoCon play, to finish in a three-way tie for eighth place. As the No. 10 seed in the SoCon tournament, they lost in the first round to Samford.

== Previous season ==
The Bulldogs finished the 2017–18 season 11–21, 5–13 in SoCon play, to finish in eighth place. They defeated VMI in the first round of the SoCon tournament before losing in the quarterfinals to UNC Greensboro.

== Roster ==
2018–19 The Citadel Bulldogs men's basketball team
Players
Coaches

Pos.	#	Name	Height	Weight	Year	Hometown
G	2	Quayson Williams	5 ft 11 in (1.8 m)	170 lb (77 kg)	Sr	Trenton, NJ
G	3	Matt Frierson	6 ft 2 in (1.88 m)	160 lb (73 kg)	Sr	Laurel, MD
G	4	Robert Guyton	5 ft 11 in (1.8 m)	160 lb (73 kg)	Fr	Myrtle Beach, SC
F	11	Kaiden Rice	6 ft 6 in (1.98 m)	185 lb (84 kg)	So	Columbia, SC
F	12	Connor Kern	6 ft 4 in (1.93 m)	190 lb (86 kg)	Sr	Pickerington, OH
G	13	Lew Stallworth	6 ft 1 in (1.85 m)	200 lb (91 kg)	Sr	Los Angeles, CA
G	15	Jerry III Higgins	5 ft 10 in (1.78 m)	165 lb (75 kg)	Fr	Cleveland, OH
F	20	Dimitri Georgiadis	6 ft 9 in (2.06 m)	225 lb (102 kg)	Fr	Richmond, VA
G	23	Kaelon Harris	6 ft 4 in (1.93 m)	220 lb (100 kg)	Jr	Atlanta, GA
F	24	Tyler Burgess	6 ft 7 in (2.01 m)	195 lb (88 kg)	Jr	Easley, SC
F	25	Alex Reed	6 ft 5 in (1.96 m)	210 lb (95 kg)	So	Garner, NC
F	32	Derek Jr. Webster	6 ft 5 in (1.96 m)	215 lb (98 kg)	So	Tampa, FL
F	33	Hayden Brown	6 ft 6 in (1.98 m)	215 lb (98 kg)	So	Greer, SC
F	35	Zane Najdawi	6 ft 7 in (2.01 m)	220 lb (100 kg)	Sr	Midlothian, VA

Head coach

- Duggar Baucom (UNC Charlotte)

Assistant coach(es)

- Daniel Willis (Lenoir–Rhyne)
- Willie Bell (VMI)
- Jack Castleberry (VMI)

Legend

- (C) Team captain
- (S) Suspended
- (I) Ineligible
- (W) Walk-on
- Injured
- Current redshirt

Roster
Last update: August 4, 2024

== Schedule and results ==
Date time, TV	Rank^{#}	Opponent^{#}	Result	Record	Site (attendance) city, state
Exhibition
November 1, 2018*; 7:00 p.m.		North Greenville	W 141–88		McAlister Field House; Charleston, SC
Regular season
November 6, 2018*; 7:00 p.m., ACCNX		at No. 22 Clemson	L 80–100	0–1	Littlejohn Coliseum (7,491); Clemson, SC
November 12, 2018*; 7:00 p.m., ESPN+		Mid-Atlantic Christian; Las Vegas Invitational Regional Round	W 148–75	1–1	McAlister Field House (463); Charleston, SC
November 14, 2018*; 7:00 p.m., ESPN3		Johnson (FL); Las Vegas Invitational Regional Round	W 137–60	2–1	McAlister Field House (246); Charleston, SC
November 16, 2018*; 8:00 p.m., LHN		at Texas; Las Vegas Invitational Regional Round	L 69–97	2–2	Frank Erwin Center (8,212); Austin, TX
November 20, 2018*; 7:00 p.m.		at James Madison	W 91–82	3–2	JMU Convocation Center (1,982); Harrisonburg, VA
November 24, 2018*; 7:00 p.m., ESPN3		at South Florida	W 84–81	4–2	Yuengling Center (2,626); Tampa, FL
November 27, 2018*; 7:00 p.m., ESPN+		High Point	W 112–87	5–2	McAlister Field House (556); Charleston, SC
December 1, 2018; 1:00 p.m., ESPN+		Mercer	W 79–69	6–2 (1–0)	McAlister Field House (765); Charleston, SC
December 5, 2018*; 7:00 p.m., ESPN3		Johnson & Wales (NC)	W 127–93	7–2	McAlister Field House (456); Charleston, SC
December 15, 2018*; 1:00 p.m., ESPN+		Southeast Missouri State	W 86–74	8–2	McAlister Field House (922); Charleston, SC
December 18, 2018*; 7:00 p.m., ESPN+		at Campbell	W 82–76	9–2	John W. Pope Jr. Convocation Center (1,586); Buies Creek, NC
December 29, 2018*; 7:00 p.m., ESPN3		Longwood	L 94–110	9–3	McAlister Field House (964); Charleston, SC
January 3, 2019; 7:00 p.m., ESPN+		at Wofford; Rivalry	L 81–112	9–4 (1–1)	Jerry Richardson Indoor Stadium (3,400); Spartanburg, SC
January 5, 2019; 4:00 p.m., ESPN3		at Furman; Rivalry	L 85–101	9–5 (1–2)	Timmons Arena (2,462); Greenville, SC
January 10, 2019; 7:00 p.m., ESPN+		East Tennessee State	L 73–98	9–6 (1–3)	McAlister Field House (1,253); Charleston, SC
January 12, 2019; 1:00 p.m., ESPN+		Western Carolina	L 82–94	9–7 (1–4)	McAlister Field House (1,042); Charleston, SC
January 17, 2019; 7:30 p.m., ESPN+		at Samford	L 77–80	9–8 (1–5)	Timmons Arena (1,512); Greenville, SC
January 19, 2019; 4:30 p.m., ESPN3		at Chattanooga	L 71–73	9–9 (1–6)	McKenzie Arena (4,229); Chattanooga, TN
January 24, 2019; 7:00 p.m., ESPN+		at UNC Greensboro	L 60–83	9–10 (1–7)	Greensboro Coliseum (5,014); Greensboro, NC
January 26, 2019; 1:00 p.m., ESPN+		VMI; Rivalry	W 84–82	10–10 (2–7)	McAlister Field House (3,864); Charleston, SC
January 31, 2019; 7:00 p.m., ESPN+		Furman; Rivalry	L 61–71	10–11 (2–8)	McAlister Field House (1,411); Charleston, SC
February 2, 2019; 1:00 p.m., ESPN3		Wofford; Rivalry	L 61–99	10–12 (2–9)	McAlister Field House (1,224); Charleston, SC
February 9, 2019; 4:00 p.m., ESPN3		at Mercer	W 67–61	11–12 (3–9)	Hawkins Arena (2,185); Macon, GA
February 14, 2019; 7:00 p.m., ESPN3		at East Tennessee State	L 83–91	11–13 (3–10)	Freedom Hall Civic Center (3,723); Johnson City, TN
February 16, 2019; 2:00 p.m., ESPN+		at Western Carolina	L 82–103	11–14 (3–11)	Ramsey Center (1,633); Cullowhee, NC
February 21, 2019; 7:00 p.m., ESPN3		Chattanooga	L 65–68	11–15 (3–12)	McAlister Field House (1,015); Charleston, SC
February 23, 2019; 1:00 p.m., ESPN3		Samford	W 87–83 ^{OT}	12–15 (4–12)	McAlister Field House (919); Charleston, SC
February 28, 2019; 11:30 a.m., ESPN+		UNC Greensboro	L 96–100	12–16 (4–13)	McAlister Field House (979); Charleston, SC
March 2, 2019; 1:00 p.m., ESPN+		at VMI; Rivalry	L 78–81	12–17 (4–14)	Cameron Hall (2,900); Lexington, VA
SoCon tournament
March 7, 2019; 7:30 p.m., ESPN+	(10)	vs. (7) Samford	L 71–100	12–18	U.S. Cellular Center (2,321); Asheville, NC
*Non-conference game. (#) Tournament seedings in parentheses. All times are in Eastern Time.
