= 2019 Southern Conference men's basketball tournament =

- Classification: Division I
- Season: 2018–19
- Teams: 10
- Site: U.S. Cellular Center; Asheville, North Carolina
- Champions: Wofford (5th title)
- Winning coach: Mike Young (5th title)
- MVP: Fletcher Magee (Wofford)
- Television: ESPN+, ESPN

2018–19 Southern Conference men's basketball standings
	Conf.				Overall
Team	W		L	PCT	W		L	PCT
No. 19 Wofford †	18	–	0	1.000	30	–	5	.857
UNC Greensboro	15	–	3	.833	29	–	7	.806
Furman	13	–	5	.722	25	–	8	.758
East Tennessee State	13	–	5	.722	24	–	10	.706
Chattanooga	7	–	11	.389	12	–	20	.375
Mercer	6	–	12	.333	11	–	20	.355
Samford	6	–	12	.333	17	–	16	.515
VMI	4	–	14	.222	11	–	21	.344
Western Carolina	4	–	14	.222	7	–	25	.219
The Citadel	4	–	14	.222	12	–	18	.400
† 2019 SoCon tournament winner Rankings from AP poll

The 2019 Southern Conference men's basketball tournament was the postseason men's basketball tournament for the Southern Conference for the 2018–19 season. All tournament games were played at the U.S. Cellular Center in Asheville, North Carolina, from March 8 through 11, 2019.

20th ranked Wofford defeated UNC Greensboro 70–58 in the championship game to win the tournament, and received the conference's automatic bid to the 2019 NCAA tournament. Wofford's perfect season in the SoCon, (perfect regular season, and winning the conference tournament) was the first since the Stephen Curry led Davidson Wildcats accomplished the feat in the 2007–08 season.

== Seeds ==
All ten teams in the Southern Conference were eligible to compete in the conference tournament. Teams were seeded by record within the conference, with a tiebreaker system to seed teams with identical conference records. The top six teams received first-round byes.

Seed	School	Conference	Tiebreaker 1	Tiebreaker 2	Tiebreaker 3
1	Wofford	18–0			
2	UNC Greensboro	15–3			
3	Furman	13–5	1–1 vs ETSU	0–2 vs Wofford	1–1 vs UNC Greensboro
4	East Tennessee State	13–5	1–1 vs Furman	0–2 vs Wofford	0–2 vs UNC Greensboro
5	Chattanooga	7–11			
6	Mercer	6–12	2–0 vs Samford		
7	Samford	6–12	0–2 vs Mercer		
8	VMI	4–14	3–1 vs Western Carolina/The Citadel		
9	Western Carolina	4–14	2–2 vs VMI/The Citadel		
10	The Citadel	4–14	1–3 vs VMI/Western Carolina		

== Schedule and results ==
Game	Time	Matchup	Score	Television
First round – Friday, March 8
1	5:00 pm	No. 8 VMI vs No. 9 Western Carolina	96–83	ESPN+
2	7:30 pm	No. 7 Samford vs No. 10 The Citadel	100–71	ESPN+
Quarterfinals – Saturday, March 9
3	12:00 pm	No. 1 Wofford vs No. 8 VMI	99–72	ESPN+
4	2:30 pm	No. 4 East Tennessee State vs No. 5 Chattanooga	68–64	ESPN+
5	6:00 pm	No. 2 UNC Greensboro vs No. 7 Samford	77–70	ESPN+
6	8:30 pm	No. 3 Furman vs No. 6 Mercer	85–74	ESPN+
Semifinals – Sunday, March 10
7	4:00 pm	No. 1 Wofford vs No. 4 East Tennessee State	81–72	ESPN+
8	6:30 pm	No. 2 UNC Greensboro vs No. 3 Furman	66–62	ESPN+
Final – Monday, March 11
9	7:00 pm	No. 1 Wofford vs. No. 2 UNC Greensboro	70–58	ESPN
*Game times in EST for first round and quarterfinals, and EDT for semifinals and final. Rankings denote tournament seed

== Bracket ==
First round March 8 ESPN+
8	VMI	96
9	Western Carolina	83
7	Samford	100
10	The Citadel	71

Quarterfinals; March 9 ESPN+
1	Wofford	99
8	VMI	72
4	East Tennessee State	68
5	Chattanooga	64
2	UNC Greensboro	77
7	Samford	70
3	Furman	85
6	Mercer	74

Semifinals; March 10; ESPN+
1	Wofford	81
4	East Tennessee State	72
2	UNC Greensboro	66
3	Furman	62

Championship; March 11; ESPN
1	Wofford	70
2	UNC Greensboro	58

== See also ==
- 2019 Southern Conference women's basketball tournament
