= 2018–19 UNC Greensboro Spartans men's basketball team =

American college basketball season

2018–19 UNC Greensboro Spartans men's basketball
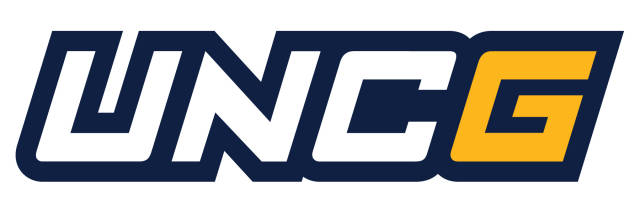

NIT, Second Round
- Conference: Southern Conference
- Record: 29–7 (15–3 SoCon)
- Head coach: Wes Miller (8th season)
- Assistant coaches: Mike Roberts; Andre Gray; Kyle Bankhead
- Home arena: Greensboro Coliseum Complex; Fleming Gymnasium

2018–19 Southern Conference men's basketball standings
	Conf.				Overall
Team	W		L	PCT	W		L	PCT
No. 19 Wofford †	18	–	0	1.000	30	–	5	.857
UNC Greensboro	15	–	3	.833	29	–	7	.806
Furman	13	–	5	.722	25	–	8	.758
East Tennessee State	13	–	5	.722	24	–	10	.706
Chattanooga	7	–	11	.389	12	–	20	.375
Mercer	6	–	12	.333	11	–	20	.355
Samford	6	–	12	.333	17	–	16	.515
VMI	4	–	14	.222	11	–	21	.344
Western Carolina	4	–	14	.222	7	–	25	.219
The Citadel	4	–	14	.222	12	–	18	.400
† 2019 SoCon tournament winner Rankings from AP poll

The 2018–19 UNC Greensboro Spartans men's basketball team represented the University of North Carolina at Greensboro during the 2018–19 NCAA Division I men's basketball season. The Spartans finished the season 29–7, 15–3 in SoCon play, and were the SoCon regular season runners-up. They defeated Samford and Furman before falling to regular season champion Wofford in the title game of the SoCon Tournament. They received an at-large bid to the National Invitation Tournament where they beat Campbell in the first round before losing to eventual tournament runners-up Lipscomb.

== Previous season ==
The Spartans finished the 2017–18 season 27–8, 15–3 in SoCon play, and were the SoCon regular season champions. They defeated The Citadel, Wofford, and East Tennessee State to become champions of the SoCon tournament. They received the SoCon's automatic bid to the NCAA tournament where they lost in the first round to Gonzaga.

== Roster ==
2018–19 UNC Greensboro Spartans men's basketball team
Players
Coaches

Pos.	#	Name	Height	Weight	Year	Hometown
F	1	Isaiah Miller	6 ft 0 in (1.83 m)	180 lb (82 kg)	So	Covington, Georgia
G	2	Malik Massey	6 ft 3 in (1.91 m)	195 lb (88 kg)	Jr	Charlotte, North Carolina
G	3	Michael Hueitt, Jr.	6 ft 3 in (1.91 m)	165 lb (75 kg)	RS So	Fayetteville, North Carolina
F	4	Mohammed Abdulsalam	6 ft 9 in (2.06 m)	255 lb (116 kg)	RS Fr	Ibadan, Nigeria
G	10	Francis Alonso	6 ft 3 in (1.91 m)	185 lb (84 kg)	Sr	Málaga, Spain
G	11	Demetrius Troy	6 ft 0 in (1.83 m)	187 lb (85 kg)	Sr	Raleigh, North Carolina
F	13	Angelo Allegri	6 ft 7 in (2.01 m)	205 lb (93 kg)	Fr	Kansas City, Missouri
F	14	Kyrin Galloway	6 ft 8 in (2.03 m)	215 lb (98 kg)	Jr	Milton, Georgia
F	15	Khyre Thompson	6 ft 6 in (1.98 m)	175 lb (79 kg)	Fr	Kernersville, North Carolina
F	21	James Dickey	6 ft 10 in (2.08 m)	200 lb (91 kg)	RS Jr	Raleigh, North Carolina
G	22	Jack Konstanzer	5 ft 11 in (1.8 m)	165 lb (75 kg)	RS So	Kill Devil Hills, North Carolina
C	25	Lloyd Burgess	6 ft 11 in (2.11 m)	270 lb (122 kg)	Sr	Durham, North Carolina
G	30	Ryan Tankelewicz	5 ft 11 in (1.8 m)	170 lb (77 kg)	Fr	Raleigh, North Carolina
F	35	Eric Hamilton	6 ft 9 in (2.06 m)	250 lb (113 kg)	RS Jr	Atlanta, Georgia
G	44	Kaleb Hunter	6 ft 4 in (1.93 m)	190 lb (86 kg)	RS Fr	Raleigh, North Carolina

Head coach

- Wes Miller (North Carolina)

Assistant coach(es)

- Mike Roberts (Indiana)
- Andre Gray (Methodist)
- Kyle Bankhead (Gonzaga)

Legend

- (C) Team captain
- (S) Suspended
- (I) Ineligible
- (W) Walk-on
- Injured
- Current redshirt

Roster
Last update: October 22, 2018

== Schedule and results ==
Date time, TV	Rank^{#}	Opponent^{#}	Result	Record	Site (attendance) city, state
Non-conference regular season
Nov 6, 2018*; 7:30 pm		at North Carolina A&T; Battle of Market Street	W 74–66	1–0	Corbett Sports Center (5,006); Greensbor, NC
Nov 9, 2018*; 8:00 pm, SECN+		at No. 23 LSU	L 91–97	1–1	Pete Maravich Assembly Center (8,613); Baton Rouge, LA
Nov 13, 2018*; 7:00 pm		at UNC Wilmington	W 82–61	2–1	Trask Coliseum (3,733); Wilmington, NC
Nov 16, 2018*; 7:00 pm, ESPN+		Johnson & Wales (NC); Delaware Invitational	W 105–57	3–1	Greensboro Coliseum (3,379); Greensboro, NC
Nov 19, 2018*; 7:00 pm		Prairie View A&M	W 74–66	4–1	Greensboro Coliseum (2,220); Greensboro, NC
Nov 23, 2018*; 7:00 pm		at Delaware; Delaware Invitational	W 84–65	5–1	Bob Carpenter Center (1,556); Newark, DE
Nov 24, 2018*; 7:00 pm		vs. Louisiana Tech; Delaware Invitational	W 80–73	6–1	Bob Carpenter Center (172); Newark, DE
Nov 27, 2018*; 7:00 pm		Greensboro College; Delaware Invitational	W 111–33	7–1	Greensboro Coliseum (2,136); Greensboro, NC
Dec 1, 2018*; 1:00 pm, ESPN2		at No. 10 Kentucky	L 61–78	7–2	Rupp Arena (21,853); Lexington, KY
Dec 7, 2018*; 7:00 pm		at Elon	W 75–74	8–2	Schar Center (2,231); Elon, NC
Dec 12, 2018*; 7:00 pm		Coppin State	W 77–54	9–2	Greensboro Coliseum (1,877); Greensboro, NC
Dec 15, 2018*; 5:00 pm, ESPN+		North Alabama	W 53–48	10–2	Fleming Gymnasium (1,545); Greensboro, NC
Dec 18, 2018*; 7:00 pm, ESPN+		Radford	W 65–58	11–2	Greensboro Coliseum (2,059); Greensboro, NC
SoCon regular season
Dec 22, 2018; 3:00 pm, ESPN+		at Samford	W 83–75	12–2 (1–0)	Pete Hanna Center (974); Homewood, AL
Dec 29, 2018; 5:00 pm, ESPN+		Chattanooga	W 85–72	13–2 (2–0)	Greensboro Coliseum (2,285); Greensboro, NC
Jan 5, 2019; 3:00 pm, ESPN+		at VMI	W 71–68	14–2 (3–0)	Cameron Hall (600); Lexington, VA
Jan 10, 2019; 7:00 pm, ESPN3		Wofford	L 43–72	14–3 (3–1)	Greensboro Coliseum (2,974); Greensboro, NC
Jan 12, 2019; 5:00 pm, ESPN3		Furman	W 89–79	15–3 (4–1)	Greensboro Coliseum (3,175); Greensboro, NC
Jan 17, 2019; 7:30 pm, ESPN+		at Western Carolina	W 69–60	16–3 (5–1)	Ramsey Center (2,226); Cullowhee, NC
Jan 19, 2019; 4:00 pm, ESPN3		at East Tennessee State	W 75–68	17–3 (6–1)	Freedom Hall Civic Center (5,702); Johnson City, TN
Jan 24, 2019; 7:00 pm, ESPN+		The Citadel	W 83–60	18–3 (7–1)	Greensboro Coliseum (5,014); Greensboro, NC
Jan 26, 2019; 5:00 pm, ESPN+		Mercer	W 88–81	19–3 (8–1)	Greensboro Coliseum (2,928); Greensboro, NC
Jan 31, 2019; 7:00 pm, ESPN3		VMI	W 93–66	20–3 (9–1)	Greensboro Coliseum (2,639); Greensboro, NC
Feb 7, 2019; 7:00 pm, ESPN+		Samford	W 75–67	21–3 (10–1)	Greensboro Coliseum (2,607); Greensboro, NC
Feb 9, 2019; 7:00 pm, ESPN+		at Chattanooga	W 78–63	22–3 (11–1)	McKenzie Arena (3,093); Chattanooga, TN
Feb 14, 2019; 7:30 pm, ESPN+		at Furman	L 57–67	22–4 (11–2)	Timmons Arena (1,719); Greenville, SC
Feb 16, 2019; 7:00 pm, ESPN+		at Wofford	L 50–80	22–5 (11–3)	Jerry Richardson Indoor Stadium (3,400); Spartanburg, SC
Feb 21, 2019; 7:00 pm, ESPN+		Western Carolina	W 79–76 ^{OT}	23–5 (12–3)	Greensboro Coliseum (3,851); Greensboro, NC
Feb 24, 2019; 3:00 pm, ESPN+		East Tennessee State	W 60–59	24–5 (13–3)	Greensboro Coliseum (6,021); Greensboro, NC
Feb 28, 2019; 7:00 pm, ESPN+		at The Citadel	W 100–96	25–5 (14–3)	McAlister Field House (979); Charleston, SC
Mar 2, 2019; 4:30 pm, ESPN+		at Mercer	W 74–47	26–5 (15–3)	Hawkins Arena (1,406); Macon, GA
SoCon tournament
Mar 9, 2019; 6:00 pm, ESPN+	(2)	vs. (7) Samford; Quarterfinals	W 77–70	27–5	U.S. Cellular Center; Asheville, NC
Mar 10, 2019; 6:30 pm, ESPN+	(2)	vs. (3) Furman; Semifinals	W 66–62	28–5	U.S. Cellular Center (6,273); Asheville, NC
Mar 11, 2019; 7:00 pm, ESPN	(2)	vs. (1) No. 20 Wofford; Championship	L 58–70	28–6	U.S. Cellular Center; Asheville, NC
NIT
Mar 19, 2019*; 7:00 pm, ESPN3	(1)	(8) Campbell; First Round – UNC Greensboro Bracket	W 84–69	29–6	Greensboro Coliseum (4,459); Greensboro, NC
Mar 23, 2019*; 2:00 pm, ESPN	(1)	(5) Lipscomb; Second Round – UNC Greensboro Bracket	L 69–86	29–7	Greensboro Coliseum (4,248); Greensboro, NC
*Non-conference game. ^{#}Rankings from AP Poll. (#) Tournament seedings in parentheses. All times are in Eastern Time.
