= 2018–19 Southern Conference men's basketball season =

- League: NCAA Division I
- Sport: Basketball
- Duration: November 2018 through March 2019
- Teams: 10

Regular Season

Tournament

Southern Conference men's basketball seasons
- ← 2017–18 2019–20 →

2018–19 Southern Conference men's basketball standings
	Conf.				Overall
Team	W		L	PCT	W		L	PCT
No. 19 Wofford †	18	–	0	1.000	30	–	5	.857
UNC Greensboro	15	–	3	.833	29	–	7	.806
Furman	13	–	5	.722	25	–	8	.758
East Tennessee State	13	–	5	.722	24	–	10	.706
Chattanooga	7	–	11	.389	12	–	20	.375
Mercer	6	–	12	.333	11	–	20	.355
Samford	6	–	12	.333	17	–	16	.515
VMI	4	–	14	.222	11	–	21	.344
Western Carolina	4	–	14	.222	7	–	25	.219
The Citadel	4	–	14	.222	12	–	18	.400
† 2019 SoCon tournament winner Rankings from AP poll

The 2018–19 Southern Conference men's basketball season began with practices in October 2018, followed by the start of the 2018–19 NCAA Division I men's basketball season in November. Conference play will begin in January 2019 and conclude in February 2019. The season marked the 97th season of Southern Conference basketball.

== Preseason ==
=== Coaching changes ===
On March 3, 2018, Western Carolina head coach Larry Hunter resigned after 13 seasons. On March 27, Winthrop associate head coach Mark Prosser, son of the late Skip Prosser, was named head coach of the Catamounts.

=== Conference predictions ===
==== Predicted results ====
Preseason Southern Conference Coaches Poll

1. UNCG (6) 78
2. Wofford (4) 74
3. ETSU 67
4. Furman 57
5. Mercer 48
6. The Citadel 38
7. Chattanooga 30
8. Samford 26
9. Western Carolina 20
10. VMI 12

Preseason Southern Conference Media Poll

1. UNCG (16) 231
2. Wofford (6) 214
3. ETSU (2) 198
4. Furman 169
5. Mercer 136
6. Chattanooga 103
7. The Citadel 96
8. Samford 69
9. Western Carolina 59
10. VMI 45

==== Preseason Southern teams ====
Preseason Player of the Year

- Fletcher Magee, Sr., G, Wofford

Preseason All-Southern Conference Team

- Zane Najdawi Sr., F, The Citadel
- Tray Boyd III Jr., G, ETSU
- Bo Hodges, So., G/F, ETSU
- Jeromy Rodriguez, R-Jr., F, ETSU
- Matt Rafferty Sr., F, Furman
- Ross Cummings Jr., G, Mercer
- Francis Alonso, Sr., G, UNCG
- James Dickey, Jr., F, UNCG
- Bubba Parham, So., G, VMI
- Cameron Jackson, Sr., F, Wofford
- Fletcher Magee Sr., G, Wofford
