= 2018–19 Samford Bulldogs men's basketball team =

American college basketball season

2018–19 Samford Bulldogs men's basketball
- Conference: Southern Conference
- Record: 17–16 (6–12 SoCon)
- Head coach: Scott Padgett (5th season)
- Assistant coaches: Shawn Finney; Sidney Ball; Charles Newton
- Home arena: Pete Hanna Center

2018–19 Southern Conference men's basketball standings
	Conf.				Overall
Team	W		L	PCT	W		L	PCT
No. 19 Wofford †	18	–	0	1.000	30	–	5	.857
UNC Greensboro	15	–	3	.833	29	–	7	.806
Furman	13	–	5	.722	25	–	8	.758
East Tennessee State	13	–	5	.722	24	–	10	.706
Chattanooga	7	–	11	.389	12	–	20	.375
Mercer	6	–	12	.333	11	–	20	.355
Samford	6	–	12	.333	17	–	16	.515
VMI	4	–	14	.222	11	–	21	.344
Western Carolina	4	–	14	.222	7	–	25	.219
The Citadel	4	–	14	.222	12	–	18	.400
† 2019 SoCon tournament winner Rankings from AP poll

The 2018–19 Samford Bulldogs men's basketball team represented Samford University during the 2018–19 NCAA Division I men's basketball season. The Bulldogs, led by fifth-year head coach Scott Padgett, played their home games at the Pete Hanna Center in Homewood, Alabama as members of the Southern Conference. The Bulldogs finished the season 17–16, 6–12 in SoCon play to finish in tie for sixth place. As the No. 7 seed in the SoCon tournament, they lost in the quarterfinals to UNC Greensboro.

== Previous season ==
The Bulldogs finished the 2017–18 season 10–22, 6–12 in SoCon play to finish in seventh place. They lost in the first round of the SoCon tournament to Chattanooga.

== Roster ==
2018–19 Samford Bulldogs men's basketball team
Players
Coaches

Pos.	#	Name	Height	Weight	Year	Hometown
PG	0	Brandon Austin	6 ft 5 in (1.96 m)	200 lb (91 kg)	RS Jr	Montgomery, Alabama
PG	1	Kevion Nolan	6 ft 2 in (1.88 m)	170 lb (77 kg)	So	Anniston, Alabama
PG	3	Josh Sharkey	5 ft 10 in (1.78 m)	170 lb (77 kg)	Jr	Philadelphia, Pennsylvania
G	4	Myron Gordon	6 ft 3 in (1.91 m)	180 lb (82 kg)	Jr	Bordentown, New Jersey
G	5	Deandre Thomas	6 ft 4 in (1.93 m)	190 lb (86 kg)	Fr	Richmond, Virginia
G	11	Steven Fitzgerald	6 ft 4 in (1.93 m)	205 lb (93 kg)	Fr	Somerset, Kentucky
F	15	Stefan Lakić	6 ft 7 in (2.01 m)	220 lb (100 kg)	Sr	Višegrad, Bosnia and Herzegovina
F	21	Robert Allen	6 ft 8 in (2.03 m)	200 lb (91 kg)	RS Fr	Orlando, Florida
F	22	Logan Dye	6 ft 8 in (2.03 m)	235 lb (107 kg)	Fr	Haleyville, Alabama
F	24	Jalen Dupree	6 ft 8 in (2.03 m)	235 lb (107 kg)	Jr	Cordova, Tennessee
C	32	Ruben Guerrero	7 ft 0 in (2.13 m)	240 lb (109 kg)	RS Sr	Marbella, Spain
F	55	Stanley Henderson, Jr.	6 ft 6 in (1.98 m)	210 lb (95 kg)	Fr	Jonesboro, Georgia
F	43	JT Mumber	6 ft 7 in (2.01 m)	205 lb (93 kg)	RS Fr	Rome, Georgia

Head coach

- Scott Padgett (Kentucky)

Assistant coach(es)

- Shawn Finney (Fairmont State)
- Sidney Ball (UAB)
- Charles Newton (Tennessee Tech)

Legend

- (C) Team captain
- (S) Suspended
- (I) Ineligible
- (W) Walk-on
- Injured
- Current redshirt

Roster
Last update: October 19, 2018

== Schedule and results ==
Date time, TV	Rank^{#}	Opponent^{#}	Result	Record	Site (attendance) city, state
Non-conference regular season
Nov 6, 2018*; 6:30 pm, ESPN3		North Alabama	W 91–74	1–0	Pete Hanna Center (1,383); Homewood, AL
Nov 9, 2018*; 6:30 pm, ESPN3		Jacksonville State	W 92–72	2–0	Pete Hanna Center (1,443); Homewood, AL
Nov 12, 2018*; 6:30 pm, ESPN+		Kennesaw State	W 74–60	3–0	Pete Hanna Center (891); Homewood, AL
Nov 14, 2018*; 6:30 pm, ESPN3		Miles	W 66–57	4–0	Pete Hanna Center (808); Homewood, AL
Nov 18, 2018*; 4:00 pm, ESPN+		at Cleveland State; Buckeye Basketball Classic	W 73–60	5–0	Wolstein Center (818); Cleveland, OH
Nov 20, 2018*; 6:00 pm, BTN Plus		at No. 23 Ohio State; Buckeye Basketball Classic	L 50–68	5–1	Value City Arena (10,725); Columbus, OH
Nov 23, 2018*; 6:00 pm		at Purdue Fort Wayne; Buckeye Basketball Classic	W 74–66	6–1	Memorial Coliseum (1,275); Fort Wayne, IN
Nov 25, 2018*; 6:30 pm, ESPN+		South Carolina State	W 77–60	7–1	Pete Hanna Center (677); Homewood, AL
Nov 29, 2018*; 6:30 pm, ESPN+		Belmont	L 93–99 ^{OT}	7–2	Pete Hanna Center (1,651); Homewood, AL
Dec 9, 2018*; 4:00 pm		at Alabama A&M	W 77–59	8–2	Elmore Gymnasium (499); Huntsville, AL
Dec 13, 2018*; 6:30 pm, ESPN+		Morehead State	W 77–72 ^{OT}	9–2	Pete Hanna Center (1,172); Homewood, AL
Dec 17, 2018*; 6:30 pm, ESPN+		Houston Baptist	W 85–61	10–2	Pete Hanna Center (704); Homewood, AL
Dec 19, 2018*; 4:00 pm, SECN		at No. 3 Tennessee	L 70–83	10–3	Thompson–Boling Arena (15,794); Knoxville, TN
SoCon regular season
Dec 22, 2018; 2:00 pm, ESPN+		UNC Greensboro	L 75–83	10–4 (0–1)	Pete Hanna Center (974); Homewood, AL
Dec 29, 2018; 2:00 pm, ESPN3		VMI	W 96–68	11–4 (1–1)	Pete Hanna Center (734); Homewood, AL
Jan 3, 2019; 6:00 pm, ESPN3		at East Tennessee State	L 72–81 ^{OT}	11–5 (1–2)	Freedom Hall Civic Center (4,316); Johnson City, TN
Jan 5, 2019; 1:00 pm, ESPN+		at Western Carolina	L 69–76	11–6 (1–3)	Ramsey Center (1,295); Cullowhee, NC
Jan 12, 2019; 3:30 pm, ESPN3		at Chattanooga	L 75–80	11–7 (1–4)	McKenzie Arena (4,173); Chattanooga, TN
Jan 17, 2019; 6:30 pm, ESPN+		The Citadel	W 80–77	12–7 (2–4)	Pete Hanna Center (1,512); Homewood, AL
Jan 19, 2019; 2:00 pm, ESPN3		Mercer	L 87–93	12–8 (2–5)	Pete Hanna Center (1,391); Homewood, AL
Jan 24, 2019; 6:00 pm, ESPN+		at Wofford	L 106–107 ^{OT}	12–8 (2–6)	Jerry Richardson Indoor Stadium (2,010); Spartanburg, SC
Jan 26, 2019; 3:30 pm, ESPN3		at Furman	W 75–73	13–9 (3–6)	Timmons Arena (2,300); Greenville, SC
Jan 31, 2019; 6:30 pm, ESPN3		East Tennessee State	L 66–74	13–10 (3–7)	Pete Hanna Center (987); Homewood, AL
Feb 2, 2019; 2:00 pm, ESPN3		Western Carolina	W 92–81	14–10 (4–7)	Pete Hanna Center (974); Homewood, AL
Feb 7, 2019; 6:00 pm, ESPN+		at UNC Greensboro	L 67–75	14–11 (4–8)	Greensboro Coliseum (2,607); Greensboro, NC
Feb 9, 2019; 12:00 pm, ESPN+		at VMI	W 84–77 ^{OT}	15–11 (5–8)	Cameron Hall (912); Lexington, VA
Feb 16, 2019; 4:00 pm, ESPN+		Chattanooga	W 80–76 ^{OT}	16–11 (6–8)	Pete Hanna Center (1,165); Homewood, AL
Feb 21, 2019; 6:00 pm, ESPN3		at Mercer	L 62–65	16–12 (6–9)	Hawkins Arena (1,727); Macon, GA
Feb 23, 2019; 12:00 pm, ESPN3		at The Citadel	L 83–87 ^{OT}	16–13 (6–10)	McAlister Field House (919); Charleston, SC
Feb 28, 2019; 6:30 pm, ESPN+		Furman	L 81–90	16–14 (6–11)	Pete Hanna Center (1,812); Homewood, AL
Mar 2, 2019; 1:00 pm, ESPN3		No. 24 Wofford	L 64–85	16–15 (6–12)	Pete Hanna Center (1,655); Homewood, AL
SoCon tournament
Mar 8, 2019; 7:30 pm, ESPN+	(7)	vs. (10) The Citadel; First round	W 100–71	17–15	U.S. Cellular Center (2,321); Asheville, NC
Mar 9, 2019; 6:00 pm, ESPN+	(7)	vs. (2) UNC Greensboro; Quarterfinals	L 70–77	17–16	U.S. Cellular Center; Asheville, NC
*Non-conference game. ^{#}Rankings from AP Poll. (#) Tournament seedings in parentheses. All times are in Central Time.
