= 2018–19 Western Carolina Catamounts men's basketball team =

American college basketball season

2018–19 Western Carolina Catamounts men's basketball
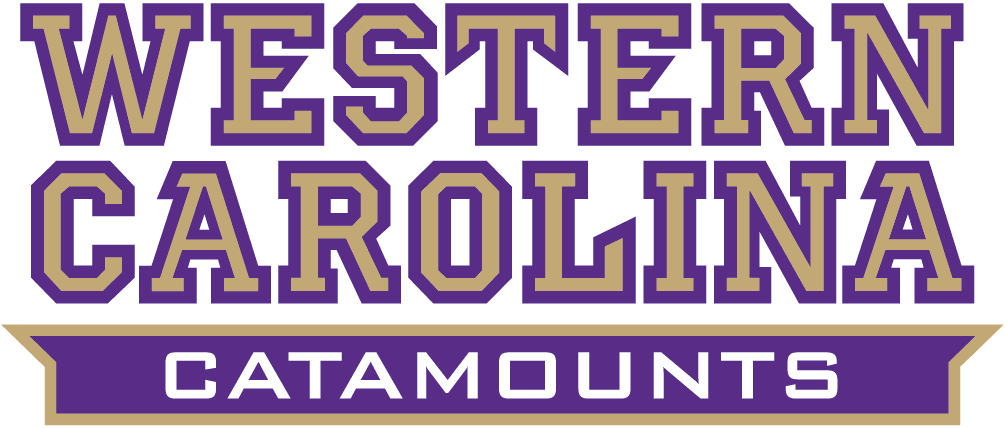
- Conference: Southern Conference
- Record: 7–25 (4–14 SoCon)
- Head coach: Mark Prosser (1st season)
- Assistant coaches: Tony Rack; Monty Sanders; Brigham Waginger
- Home arena: Ramsey Center

2018–19 Southern Conference men's basketball standings
	Conf.				Overall
Team	W		L	PCT	W		L	PCT
No. 19 Wofford †	18	–	0	1.000	30	–	5	.857
UNC Greensboro	15	–	3	.833	29	–	7	.806
Furman	13	–	5	.722	25	–	8	.758
East Tennessee State	13	–	5	.722	24	–	10	.706
Chattanooga	7	–	11	.389	12	–	20	.375
Mercer	6	–	12	.333	11	–	20	.355
Samford	6	–	12	.333	17	–	16	.515
VMI	4	–	14	.222	11	–	21	.344
Western Carolina	4	–	14	.222	7	–	25	.219
The Citadel	4	–	14	.222	12	–	18	.400
† 2019 SoCon tournament winner Rankings from AP poll

The 2018–19 Western Carolina Catamounts men's basketball team represented Western Carolina University during the 2018–19 NCAA Division I men's basketball season. The Catamounts, led by first-year head coach Mark Prosser, played their home games at the Ramsey Center in Cullowhee, North Carolina as members of the Southern Conference (SoCon). They finished the season 7–25, 4–14 in SoCon play to finish in a three-way tie for eighth place. In the Southern Conference tournament, they were defeated by VMI in the first round.

== Previous season ==
The Catamounts finished the 2017–18 season 13–19, 8–10 in SoCon play, to finish in sixth place. They lost in the quarterfinals of the SoCon tournament to Furman.

Following the loss to Furman, head coach Larry Hunter resigned. He finished his coaching career at Western Carolina with a record of 193–229 over 13 seasons. Winthrop associate head coach, Mark Prosser, son of the late Skip Prosser, was named Hunter's successor.

== Offseason ==
=== Player departures ===
Name	Pos.	Height	Year	Hometown	Reason for departure
Devin Peterson	G	6'1"	Senior	Milton, GA	Graduated
Haboubacar Mutombo	G	6'5"	Senior	Pickering, ON	Graduated
Deriece Parks	G	6'5"	RS Senior	Charlotte, NC	Graduated
Ashley Williams	G	6'5"	Senior	Morehead City, NC	Graduated
Devonte Fuller	G	6'1"	Senior	Hickory, NC	Graduated
Charlendez Brooks	F	6'9"	RS Senior	Duncan, SC	Graduated
Desmond Johnson	G	5'11"	Freshman	Memphis, TN	Transferred to Odessa College
Mike Amius	F	6'7"	Junior	Lake Worth, FL	Turned pro

=== Recruiting class of 2018 ===
College recruiting information
Name	Hometown	School	Height	Weight	Commit date
D.J. Myers; F	Raleigh, NC	Hargrave Military Academy	6 ft 6 in (1.98 m)	200 lb (91 kg)	
D.J. Myers; F	Recruit ratings: No ratings found				
Kameron Gibson; G	Cincinnati, OH	Walnut Hills High School	6 ft 3 in (1.91 m)	192 lb (87 kg)	
Kameron Gibson; G	Recruit ratings: No ratings found				
Josh Cottrell; G	Hayesville, NC	Hayesville High School	6 ft 2 in (1.88 m)	185 lb (84 kg)	
Josh Cottrell; G	Recruit ratings: No ratings found				
Overall recruit ranking:
Note: In many cases, Scout, Rivals, 247Sports, On3, and ESPN may conflict in their listings of height and weight.; In these cases, the average was taken. ESPN grades are on a 100-point scale.; Sources:

=== Incoming transfers ===
Name	Pos.	Height	Weight	Year	Hometown	Previous school	Years remaining	Notes
Douglas Elks	G/F	6'5"	200	Sophomore	Raleigh, NC	Roanoke College	3	Will have to sit out 2018–19 season due to NCAA transfer rules
Mason Faulkner	G	6'1"	190	Junior	Glasgow, KY	Northern Kentucky	2	Will have to sit out 2018–19 season due to NCAA transfer rules
Carlos Dotson	F	6'7"	270	Junior	Riverdale, MD	Central Florida CC	2	Eligible immediately

== Roster ==
2018–19 Western Carolina Catamounts men's basketball team
Players
Coaches

Pos.	#	Name	Height	Weight	Year	Hometown
G	0	Maurice Smith	6 ft 6 in (1.98 m)	215 lb (98 kg)	Jr	Lauderdale Lakes, FL
G	2	Matt Halvorsen	6 ft 1 in (1.85 m)	170 lb (77 kg)	So	Kingsport, TN
G	3	Jason McMillan	5 ft 11 in (1.8 m)	165 lb (75 kg)	Jr	Cherokee, NC
F	4	Carlos Dotson	6 ft 7 in (2.01 m)	265 lb (120 kg)	Jr	Riverdale, MD
F	5	D.J. Myers	6 ft 6 in (1.98 m)	200 lb (91 kg)	Fr	Raleigh, NC
G/F	10	Douglas Elks	6 ft 4 in (1.93 m)	189 lb (86 kg)	So	Raleigh, NC
G	11	Mason Faulkner	6 ft 1 in (1.85 m)	165 lb (75 kg)	RS So	Glasgow, KY
F	12	Marc Gosselin	6 ft 7 in (2.01 m)	205 lb (93 kg)	Sr	Lyon, France
G	14	Kameron Gibson	6 ft 3 in (1.91 m)	180 lb (82 kg)	RS Fr	Cincinnati, OH
G	15	Josh Cottrell	6 ft 2 in (1.88 m)	185 lb (84 kg)	Fr	Hayesville, NC
G	21	Marcus Thomas	6 ft 3 in (1.91 m)	180 lb (82 kg)	So	Mint Hill, NC
F	33	Onno Steger	6 ft 5 in (1.96 m)	205 lb (93 kg)	Jr	Upper Arlington, OH
F	35	Yalim Olcay	6 ft 8 in (2.03 m)	225 lb (102 kg)	Jr	İzmir, Turkey
F	44	Adam Sledd	6 ft 8 in (2.03 m)	220 lb (100 kg)	Jr	Roanoke, VA

Head coach

- Mark Prosser (Marist)

Assistant coach(es)

- Tony Rack (Northern Kentucky)
- Monty Sanders (Elon)
- Brigham Waginger (Western Carolina)

Legend

- (C) Team captain
- (S) Suspended
- (I) Ineligible
- (W) Walk-on
- Injured
- Current redshirt

Roster
Last update: September 5, 2024

== Schedule and results ==
Date time, TV	Rank^{#}	Opponent^{#}	Result	Record	Site (attendance) city, state
Regular season
November 7, 2018*; 7:00 p.m., ESPN+		at Wright State; Cancún Challenge campus game	L 73–96	0–1	Nutter Center (3,292); Fairborn, OH
November 10, 2018*; 12:00 p.m., ESPN3		College of Charleston	L 74–77	0–2	Ramsey Center (1,689); Cullowhee, NC
November 14, 2018*; 8:00 p.m., ESPN3		at SMU; Cancún Challenge campus game	L 65–98	0–3	Moody Coliseum (5,440); Dallas, TX
November 17, 2018*; 4:00 p.m.		Hiwassee	W 94–55	1–3	Ramsey Center (500); Cullowhee, NC
November 20, 2018*; 12:30 p.m.		vs. Jacksonville State; Cancún Challenge Mayan Division semifinals	L 53–84	1–4	Hard Rock Hotel Riviera Convention Center; Cancún, Mexico
November 21, 2018*; 12:30pm		vs. Southern Miss; Cancún Challenge Mayan Division consolation	L 63–68	1–5	Hard Rock Hotel Riviera Convention Center; Cancún, Mexico
November 24, 2018*; 2:00 p.m.		Jacksonville	W 77–65	2–5	Ramsey Center (778); Cullowhee, NC
November 27, 2018*; 7:00 p.m., ACCN Extra		at Wake Forest	L 64–71	2–6	LJVM Coliseum (4,741); Winston-Salem, NC
December 1, 2018; 4:00 p.m., ESPN+		at Furman	L 88–90 ^{2OT}	2–7 (0–1)	Timmons Arena (2,131); Greenville, SC
December 5, 2018*; 7:00 p.m., ACCN Extra		at NC State	L 67–100	2–8	PNC Arena (5,500); Raleigh, NC
December 8, 2018*; 5:30 p.m., ESPN+		at UNC Asheville	W 71–59	3–8	Kimmel Arena (1,702); Asheville, NC
December 15, 2018*; 7:00 p.m., ESPN+		at High Point	L 59–86	3–9	Millis Center (1,211); High Point, NC
December 18, 2018*; 9:00 p.m., BTN		at No. 23 Iowa	L 60–78	3–10	Carver–Hawkeye Arena (9,642); Iowa City, IA
December 21, 2018*; 1:00 p.m.		at Bowling Green	L 52–73	3–11	Stroh Center (1,715); Bowling Green, OH
December 29, 2018; 12:00 p.m., ESPN+		Wofford	L 54–74	3–12 (0–2)	Ramsey Center (1,043); Cullowhee, NC
January 3, 2019; 7:00 p.m., ESPN3		Chattanooga	L 62–73	3–13 (0–3)	Ramsey Center (1,322); Cullowhee, NC
January 5, 2019; 7:00 p.m., ESPN+		Samford	W 76–69	4–13 (1–3)	Ramsey Center (1,295); Cullowhee, NC
January 10, 2019; 7:00 p.m., ESPN+		at Mercer	L 80–84	4–14 (1–4)	Hawkins Arena (2,521); Macon, GA
January 12, 2019; 1:00 p.m., ESPN+		at The Citadel	W 94–82	5–14 (2–4)	McAlister Field House (1,042); Charleston, SC
January 17, 2019; 7:30 p.m., ESPN+		UNC Greensboro	L 60–69	5–15 (2–5)	Ramsey Center (2,226); Cullowhee, NC
January 19, 2019; 1:00 p.m., ESPN+		at VMI	L 83–91	5–16 (2–6)	Cameron Hall (2,500); Lexington, VA
January 26, 2019; 7:00 p.m., ESPN3		East Tennessee State	W 91–69	5–17 (2–7)	Ramsey Center (2,095); Cullowhee, NC
January 31, 2019; 8:00 p.m.		at Chattanooga	W 105–96	6–17 (3–7)	McKenzie Arena (3,626); Chattanooga, TN
February 2, 2019; 3:00 p.m., ESPN3		at Samford	L 81–92	6–18 (3–8)	Pete Hanna Center (974); Homewood, AL
February 7, 2019; 7:30 p.m.		Furman	L 45–64	6–19 (3–9)	Ramsey Center (2,423); Cullowhee, NC
February 9, 2019; 7:00 p.m., ESPN+		at Wofford	L 56–83	6–20 (3–10)	Jerry Richardson Indoor Stadium (3,400); Spartanburg, SC
February 14, 2019; 7:00 p.m., ESPN+		Mercer	L 65–74	6–21 (3–11)	Ramsey Center (1,203); Cullowhee, NC
February 16, 2019; 2:00 p.m., ESPN+		The Citadel	W 103–82	7–21 (4–11)	Ramsey Center (1,633); Cullowhee, NC
February 21, 2019; 7:00 p.m., ESPN+		at UNC Greensboro	L 76–79 ^{OT}	7–22 (4–12)	Greensboro Coliseum (3,851); Greensboro, NC
February 23, 2019; 7:30 p.m.		VMI	L 78–83	7–23 (4–13)	Ramsey Center (2,587); Cullowhee, NC
March 2, 2019; 7:00 p.m., ESPN+		at East Tennessee State	L 74–81	7–24 (4–14)	Freedom Hall Civic Center (5,520); Johnson City, TN
SoCon tournament
March 8, 2019; 5:00 p.m., ESPN+	(9)	vs. (8) VMI; First round	L 83–96	7–25	U.S. Cellular Center (2,138); Asheville, NC
*Non-conference game. ^{#}Rankings from AP poll. (#) Tournament seedings in parentheses. All times are in Eastern.
