= 2018–19 VMI Keydets basketball team =

American college basketball season

2018–19 VMI Keydets basketball
- Conference: Southern Conference
- Record: 11–21 (4–14 SoCon)
- Head coach: Dan Earl (4th season)
- Assistant coaches: Kevin Carroll (2nd season); Austin Kenon (2nd season); Steve Enright (1st season)
- Home arena: Cameron Hall

2018–19 Southern Conference men's basketball standings
	Conf.				Overall
Team	W		L	PCT	W		L	PCT
No. 19 Wofford †	18	–	0	1.000	30	–	5	.857
UNC Greensboro	15	–	3	.833	29	–	7	.806
Furman	13	–	5	.722	25	–	8	.758
East Tennessee State	13	–	5	.722	24	–	10	.706
Chattanooga	7	–	11	.389	12	–	20	.375
Mercer	6	–	12	.333	11	–	20	.355
Samford	6	–	12	.333	17	–	16	.515
VMI	4	–	14	.222	11	–	21	.344
Western Carolina	4	–	14	.222	7	–	25	.219
The Citadel	4	–	14	.222	12	–	18	.400
† 2019 SoCon tournament winner Rankings from AP poll

The 2018–19 VMI Keydets basketball team represented the Virginia Military Institute in the 2018–19 NCAA Division I men's basketball season. The Keydets were led by fourth-year head coach Dan Earl and played their home games out of Cameron Hall in Lexington, Virginia, their home since 1981, as members of the Southern Conference. The Keydets finished the season 11–21, 4–14 in SoCon play to finish in a three-way tie for eighth place. As the No. 8 seed in the SoCon tournament, they defeated Western Carolina in the first round before losing to top-seeded Wofford in the quarterfinals.

== Previous season ==
The Keydets finished the 2017–18 campaign with a 9–21 overall record, and a 4–14 mark in SoCon play to finish in ninth place. The nine wins were three more than the previous season under Earl. They lost in the first round of the SoCon tournament to The Citadel. It was the fourth consecutive season that VMI had failed to advance in the Southern Conference tournament.

== Preseason ==
=== Departures ===
The Keydets lost only two seniors from the previous year's team in Fred Iruafemi and Armani Branch. Iruafemi was the team's fourth-leading rebounder and averaged 2.4 points per game. Branch did not play the entire year as he was sidelined with an injury and received a medical redshirt. He chose to transfer and spend his final season of eligibility at Norfolk State.

Name	Position	Class	Reason
Keith Smith	G	So.	Transferred to Cal Poly
Armani Branch	F	Sr.	Graduated; transferred to Norfolk State
Fred Iruafemi	F	Sr.	Graduated

=== Coaching changes ===
On July 3, 2018, VMI head coach Dan Earl announced the addition of Steve Enright as an assistant coach. Enright came from Bridgewater College where he had served for three years on the Eagles' coaching staff. He was also an assistant under head coach Dan Hurley at Rhode Island. Enright replaced Steve Lepore, who left for an assistant coaching position with Eastern Kentucky after three years of service under Earl.

== Roster ==
2018–19 VMI Keydets men's basketball team
Players
Coaches

Pos.	#	Name	Height	Weight	Year	Previous school	Hometown
G	0	Austin Vereen (injured)	6 ft 4 in (1.93 m)	190 lb (86 kg)	Sr	Maret School	Washington, D.C.
F	1	Tragen Fahl	6 ft 8 in (2.03 m)	180 lb (82 kg)	So	Atlantic Shores Christian	Virginia Beach, Virginia
G	2	Garrett Gilkeson	6 ft 4 in (1.93 m)	200 lb (91 kg)	Jr	Parkersburg South	Parkersburg, West Virginia
G	3	Bubba Parham	5 ft 11 in (1.8 m)	155 lb (70 kg)	So	Brookwood	Snellville, Georgia
G	4	Rafael Jenkins (injured)	6 ft 0 in (1.83 m)	160 lb (73 kg)	Fr	United Faith Christian	Charlotte, North Carolina
G	5	Greg Parham	6 ft 4 in (1.93 m)	160 lb (73 kg)	So	Monacan	Richmond, Virginia
G	11	Jordan Ratliffe (injured) (redshirt)	6 ft 0 in (1.83 m)	188 lb (85 kg)	So	Village Christian	Gibson, North Carolina
G	12	Ta'Vonne Bond	6 ft 0 in (1.83 m)	163 lb (74 kg)	So	Mount Zion Christian Academy	Columbia, South Carolina
G	15	Myles Lewis	6 ft 5 in (1.96 m)	181 lb (82 kg)	So	Victory Rock Prep	Ashburn, Virginia
F	21	Connor Arnold	6 ft 7 in (2.01 m)	205 lb (93 kg)	Fr	Grace Christian	Knoxville, Tennessee
G	24	Will Miller	6 ft 8 in (2.03 m)	210 lb (95 kg)	Jr	Halifax County	South Boston, Virginia
F	25	Tyler Creammer	6 ft 10 in (2.08 m)	245 lb (111 kg)	Jr	Miller School	Parkton, North Carolina
G	31	Sarju Patel	6 ft 3 in (1.91 m)	170 lb (77 kg)	So	Hargrave	Daleville, Virginia
C	34	Jake Stephens	6 ft 8 in (2.03 m)	230 lb (104 kg)	Fr	Musselman	Bunker Hill, West Virginia

Head coach

- Dan Earl (Penn State '97)

Assistant coach(es)

- Kevin Carroll (Berry '00)
- Steve Enright (Mount Ida '12)
- Austin Kenon (VMI '11)

Legend

- (C) Team captain
- (S) Suspended
- (I) Ineligible
- (W) Walk-on
- Injured
- Current redshirt

Roster

Ref:

=== Depth chart ===
Pos.	Starting 5	Bench 1	Bench 2
C	Jake Stephens	Tyler Creammer
PF	Myles Lewis	Will Miller	Tragen Fahl
SF	Garrett Gilkeson	Connor Arnold
SG	Sarju Patel	Ta'Vonne Bond
PG	Bubba Parham	Greg Parham

== Schedule and results ==
Date time, TV	Rank^{#}	Opponent^{#}	Result	Record	Site (attendance) city, state
Regular season
November 6, 2018*; 7:00 pm, SoCon Network		Washington College	W 89–56	1–0	Cameron Hall (762); Lexington, VA
November 9, 2018*; 7:00 pm, ACCN Extra		at Pittsburgh	L 55–94	1–1	Petersen Events Center (4,321); Pittsburgh, PA
November 11, 2018*; 1:00 pm		Goucher	W 98–34	2–1	Cameron Hall (612); Lexington, VA
November 14, 2018*; 7:00 pm, ESPN+		USC Upstate	W 78–72	3–1	Cameron Hall (826); Lexington, VA
November 18, 2018*; 6:00 pm, SECN		at No. 10 Kentucky	L 82–92	3–2	Rupp Arena (20,207); Lexington, KY
November 20, 2018*; 7:00 pm, ESPN3		Kentucky Christian	W 106–80	4–2	Cameron Hall (594); Lexington, VA
November 23, 2018*; 1:00 pm, ESPN+		at Stetson	W 87–79 ^{OT}	5–2	Edmunds Center (364); DeLand, FL
November 27, 2018*; 7:00 pm, ESPN3		American	L 64–74	5–3	Cameron Hall (922); Lexington, VA
December 1, 2018*; 3:00 pm, ESPN+		at Longwood	L 45–65	5–4	Willett Hall (1,428); Farmville, VA
December 5, 2018*; 7:00 pm, ACCN Extra		at Virginia Tech	L 68–89	5–5	Cassell Coliseum (7,748); Blacksburg, VA
December 9, 2018; 1:00 pm, ESPN+		at Chattanooga	L 65–83	5–6 (0–1)	McKenzie Arena (2,301); Chattanooga, TN
December 12, 2018*; 7:30 pm, ESPN+		at Presbyterian	L 70–103	5–7	Templeton Center (373); Clinton, SC
December 21, 2018*; 7:00 pm, ESPN+		North Alabama	W 89–68	6–7	Cameron Hall (600); Lexington, VA
December 29, 2018; 3:00 pm, ESPN3		at Samford	L 68–96	6–8 (0–2)	Pete Hanna Center (734); Homewood, AL
January 5, 2019; 1:00 pm, ESPN+		UNC Greensboro	L 68–71	6–9 (0–3)	Cameron Hall (600); Lexington, VA
January 10, 2019; 7:00 pm, ESPN3		Furman	L 57–89	6–10 (0–4)	Cameron Hall (700); Lexington, VA
January 12, 2019; 1:00 pm, ESPN+		Wofford	L 76–90	6–11 (0–5)	Cameron Hall (700); Lexington, VA
January 17, 2019; 7:00 pm, ESPN+		at East Tennessee State	L 82–85	6–12 (0–6)	Freedom Hall Civic Center (4,286); Johnson City, TN
January 19, 2019; 1:00 pm, ESPN+		Western Carolina	W 91–83	7–12 (1–6)	Cameron Hall (2,500); Lexington, VA
January 24, 2019; 7:30 pm, ESPN+		at Mercer	L 68–88	7–13 (1–7)	Hawkins Arena (2,376); Macon, GA
January 26, 2019; 1:00 pm, ESPN+		at The Citadel	L 82–84	7–14 (1–8)	McAlister Field House (3,864); Charleston, SC
January 31, 2019; 7:00 pm, ESPN3		at UNC Greensboro	L 66–93	7–15 (1–9)	Greensboro Coliseum Complex (2,639); Greensboro, NC
February 7, 2019; 7:00 pm, ESPN3		Chattanooga	L 70–71	7–16 (1–10)	Cameron Hall (657); Lexington, VA
February 9, 2019; 1:00 pm, ESPN+		Samford	L 77–84 (OT)	7–17 (1–11)	Cameron Hall (912); Lexington, VA
February 14, 2019; 7:00 pm, ESPN+		at Wofford	L 84–95	7–18 (1–12)	Jerry Richardson Indoor Stadium (2,014); Spartanburg, SC
February 16, 2019; 4:300 pm, ESPN+		at Furman	L 62–96	7–19 (1–13)	Timmons Arena (2,381); Greenville, SC
February 21, 2019; 7:00 pm, ESPN+		East Tennessee State	L 70–94	7–20 (1–14)	Cameron Hall (715); Lexington, VA
February 23, 2019; 7:30 pm		at Western Carolina	W 83–78	8–20 (2–14)	Ramsey Center (2,587); Cullowhee, NC
February 28, 2019; 7:00 pm, ESPN3		Mercer	W 84–71	9–20 (3–14)	Cameron Hall (833); Lexington, VA
March 2, 2019; 1:00 pm, ESPN+		The Citadel	W 81–78	10–20 (4–14)	Cameron Hall (2,900); Lexington, VA
Southern Conference tournament
March 8, 2019; 5:00 pm, ESPN+	(8)	vs. (9) Western Carolina; First round	W 96–83	11–20	U.S. Cellular Center (2,138); Asheville, NC
March 8, 2019; 12:00 pm, ESPN+	(8)	vs. (1) Wofford; Quarterfinals	L 72–99	11–21	U.S. Cellular Center (5,443); Asheville, NC
*Non-conference game. (#) Tournament seedings in parentheses. All times are in Eastern Time; Source.
