= 2018–19 Chattanooga Mocs men's basketball team =

American college basketball season

2018–19 Chattanooga Mocs men's basketball
- Conference: Southern Conference
- Record: 12–20 (7–11 SoCon)
- Head coach: Lamont Paris (2nd season)
- Assistant coaches: Aaron Fuss; Tanner Bronson; Walter Offutt
- Home arena: McKenzie Arena

2018–19 Southern Conference men's basketball standings
| | Conf. | | | | Overall |
| Team | W | | L | PCT | W | | L | PCT |
|---|---|---|---|---|---|---|---|---|
| No. 19 Wofford † | 18 | – | 0 | 1.000 | 30 | – | 5 | .857 |
| UNC Greensboro | 15 | – | 3 | .833 | 29 | – | 7 | .806 |
| Furman | 13 | – | 5 | .722 | 25 | – | 8 | .758 |
| East Tennessee State | 13 | – | 5 | .722 | 24 | – | 10 | .706 |
| Chattanooga | 7 | – | 11 | .389 | 12 | – | 20 | .375 |
| Mercer | 6 | – | 12 | .333 | 11 | – | 20 | .355 |
| Samford | 6 | – | 12 | .333 | 17 | – | 16 | .515 |
| VMI | 4 | – | 14 | .222 | 11 | – | 21 | .344 |
| Western Carolina | 4 | – | 14 | .222 | 7 | – | 25 | .219 |
| The Citadel | 4 | – | 14 | .222 | 12 | – | 18 | .400 |
† 2019 SoCon tournament winner Rankings from AP poll

The 2018–19 Chattanooga Mocs basketball team represented the University of Tennessee at Chattanooga during the 2018–19 NCAA Division I men's basketball season. The Mocs, led by second-year head coach Lamont Paris, played their home games at McKenzie Arena and as members of the Southern Conference.

== Previous season ==
The Mocs finished the 2017–18 season 10–23, 3–15 in SoCon play to finish for ninth place. In the SoCon tournament, they lost to East Tennessee State in the quarterfinals.

== Roster ==
2018–19 Chattanooga Mocs men's basketball team
Players
Coaches

| Pos. | # | Name | Height | Weight | Year | Hometown |
|---|---|---|---|---|---|---|
| G/F | 1 | Jonathan Scott | 6 ft 4 in (1.93 m) | 195 lb (88 kg) | Jr | Monument, Colorado |
| G | 2 | Jerry Johnson, Jr. | 6 ft 1 in (1.85 m) | 215 lb (98 kg) | RS Jr | Memphis, Tennessee |
| G | 3 | David Jean-Baptiste | 6 ft 1 in (1.85 m) | 190 lb (86 kg) | RS So | Miami, Florida |
| G | 4 | Maurice Commander | 6 ft 0 in (1.83 m) | 160 lb (73 kg) | Fr | Chicago, Illinois |
| G | 5 | Donovan Toatley | 5 ft 10 in (1.78 m) | 160 lb (73 kg) | Fr | Upper Marlboro, Maryland |
| F | 11 | Rod Johnson | 6 ft 7 in (2.01 m) | 195 lb (88 kg) | Jr | Sun Prairie, Wisconsin |
| F | 15 | Ramon Vila | 6 ft 8 in (2.03 m) | 240 lb (109 kg) | RS So | Barcelona, Spain |
| F | 21 | Duane Moss | 6 ft 6 in (1.98 m) | 185 lb (84 kg) | RS Fr | Myrtle Beach, South Carolina |
| F | 22 | Keigan Kerby | 6 ft 7 in (2.01 m) | 205 lb (93 kg) | Fr | Hampton Beach, New Hampshire |
| C | 25 | Justin Brown | 6 ft 10 in (2.08 m) | 205 lb (93 kg) | RS Fr | Chicago, Illinois |
| C | 33 | Thomas Smallwood | 7 ft 0 in (2.13 m) | 240 lb (109 kg) | Sr | Bordeaux, France |
| F | 34 | Kevin Easley | 6 ft 6 in (1.98 m) | 230 lb (104 kg) | Fr | Indianapolis, Indiana |
| G | | A.J. Caldwell | 6 ft 4 in (1.93 m) | 200 lb (91 kg) | So | Sarasota, Florida |
| G | | Alex Tostado | 6 ft 2 in (1.88 m) | 180 lb (82 kg) | So | Guadalajara, Mexico |

Head coach

- Lamont Paris (Wooster)

Assistant coach(es)

- Aaron Fuss (Ohio State)
- Tanner Bronson (Wisconsin)
- Walter Offutt (Ohio)

Legend

- (C) Team captain
- (S) Suspended
- (I) Ineligible
- (W) Walk-on
- Injured
- Current redshirt

Roster
Last update: September 23, 2018

== Schedule and results ==
| Date time, TV | Rank^{#} | Opponent^{#} | Result | Record | Site (attendance) city, state |
Exhibition
| Nov 1, 2018*; 7:00 pm | | Lee | W 62–60 | | McKenzie Arena (2,516); Chattanooga, TN |
Regular season
| Nov 6, 2018*; 7:00 pm | | at Charlotte | W 80–69 | 1–0 | Dale F. Halton Arena (3,732); Charlotte, NC |
| Nov 10, 2018*; 7:00 pm | | at Eastern Kentucky | L 78–81 | 1–1 | McKenzie Arena (2,568); Chattanooga, TN |
| Nov 13, 2018*; 7:00 pm, ESPN+ | | Cumberland (TN) | W 92–61 | 2–1 | McKenzie Arena (2,308); Chattanooga, TN |
| Nov 16, 2018*; 8:00 pm, ESPN+ | | at South Alabama; Goldie and Herman Ungar Classic | L 54–73 | 2–2 | Mitchell Center (1,585); Mobile, AL |
| Nov 17, 2018*; 5:00 pm | | vs. Southeast Missouri State; Goldie and Herman Ungar Classic | L 42–63 | 2–3 | Mitchell Center (1,605); Mobile, AL |
| Nov 18, 2018*; 4:00 pm | | vs. Jacksonville; Goldie and Herman Ungar Classic | L 66–74 | 2–4 | Mitchell Center; Mobile, AL |
| Nov 23, 2018*; 4:00 pm, BTN | | at No. 9 Michigan | L 55–83 | 2–5 | Crisler Center (12,010); Ann Arbor, MI |
| Nov 27, 2018*; 7:00 pm, ESPN3 | | Hiwassee | W 95–62 | 3–5 | McKenzie Arena (2,195); Chattanooga, TN |
| Dec 1, 2018*; 2:00 pm, ESPN+ | | Tennessee Tech | W 71-60 | 4-5 | McKenzie Arena (2,398); Chattanooga, TN |
| Dec 9, 2018; 1:00 pm, ESPN+ | | VMI | W 83–65 | 5–5 (1–0) | McKenzie Arena (2,301); Chattanooga, TN |
| Dec 12, 2018*; 7:00 pm, ESPN+ | | at Georgia State | L 88–95 | 5–6 | GSU Sports Arena (1,197); Atlanta, GA |
| Dec 16, 2018*; 6:00 pm, SECN | | at Ole Miss | L 70–90 | 5–7 | The Pavilion at Ole Miss (6,344); Oxford, MS |
| Dec 18, 2018*; 8:30 pm, ESPN+ | | at UT Martin | L 72–75 | 5–8 | Skyhawk Arena (1,054); Martin, TN |
| Dec 21, 2018*; 12:00 pm | | Bryan | W 79–45 | 6–8 | McKenzie Arena (2,283); Chattanooga, TN |
| Dec 29, 2018; 5:00 pm, ESPN+ | | at UNC Greensboro | L 72–85 | 6–9 (1–1) | Greensboro Coliseum (2,285); Greensboro, NC |
| Jan 3, 2019; 7:00 pm, ESPN3 | | at Western Carolina | W 73–62 | 7–9 (2–1) | Ramsey Center (1,322); Cullowhee, NC |
| Jan 5, 2019; 4:00 pm, ESPN+ | | at East Tennessee State | L 70–96 | 7–10 (2–2) | Freedom Hall Civic Center (5,011); Johnson City, TN |
| Jan 12, 2019; 4:30 pm, ESPN3 | | Samford | W 80–75 | 8–10 (3–2) | McKenzie Arena (4,173); Chattanooga, TN |
| Jan 17, 2019; 8:00 pm, ESPN3 | | Mercer | W 73–70 | 9–10 (4–2) | McKenzie Arena (3,769); Chattanooga, TN |
| Jan 19, 2019; 4:30 pm, ESPN3 | | The Citadel | W 73–71 | 10–10 (5–2) | McKenzie Arena (4,229); Chattanooga, TN |
| Jan 24, 2019; 7:00 pm, ESPN+ | | at Furman | L 58–73 | 10–11 (5–3) | Timmons Arena (1,630); Greenville, SC |
| Jan 26, 2019; 7:00 pm, ESPN+ | | at Wofford | L 69–80 | 10–12 (5–4) | Jerry Richardson Indoor Stadium (3,400); Spartanburg, SC |
| Jan 31, 2019; 8:00 pm, ESPN+ | | Western Carolina | L 96–105 | 10–13 (5–5) | McKenzie Arena (3,626); Chattanooga, TN |
| Feb 2, 2019; 4:30 pm, ESPN3 | | East Tennessee State | L 64–77 | 10–14 (5–6) | McKenzie Arena (4,553); Chattanooga, TN |
| Feb 7, 2019; 7:00 pm, ESPN3 | | at VMI | W 71–70 | 11–14 (6–6) | Cameron Hall (657); Lexington, VA |
| Feb 9, 2019; 7:00 pm, ESPN+ | | UNC Greensboro | L 63–78 | 11–15 (6–7) | McKenzie Arena (3,093); Chattanooga, TN |
| Feb 16, 2019; 5:00 pm, ESPN+ | | at Samford | L 76–80 ^{OT} | 11–16 (6–8) | Pete Hanna Center (1,165); Homewood, AL |
| Feb 21, 2019; 7:00 pm, ESPN3 | | at The Citadel | W 68–65 | 12–16 (7–8) | McAlister Field House (1,015); Charleston, SC |
| Feb 23, 2019; 4:00 pm, ESPN3 | | at Mercer | L 69–74 | 12–17 (7–9) | Hawkins Arena (3,227); Macon, GA |
| Feb 28, 2019; 7:00 pm, ESPN+ | | No. 24 Wofford | L 54–80 | 12–18 (7–10) | McKenzie Arena (2,909); Chattanooga, TN |
| Mar 2, 2019; 2:00 pm, ESPN+ | | Furman | L 50–71 | 12–19 (7–11) | McKenzie Arena (3,233); Chattanooga, TN |
SoCon tournament
| Mar 9, 2019; 2:30 pm, ESPN+ | (5) | vs. (4) East Tennessee State; First round | L 64–68 | 12–20 (7–11) | U.S. Cellular Center (5,443); Asheville, NC |
*Non-conference game. ^{#}Rankings from AP Poll. (#) Tournament seedings in parentheses. All times are in Eastern Time Source.

== See also ==
- 2018-19 Chattanooga Mocs women's basketball
