= 2018–19 East Tennessee State Buccaneers men's basketball team =

American college basketball season

2018–19 East Tennessee State Buccaneers men's basketball
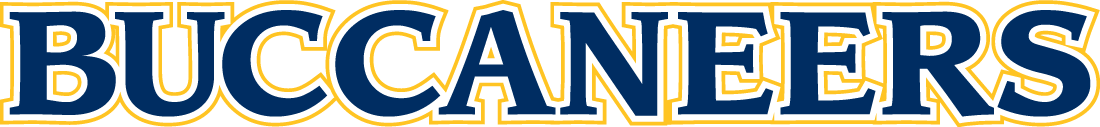

Cayman Island Classic Mainland champion Sun Bowl Invitational champion

CIT, First Round
- Conference: Southern Conference
- Record: 24–10 (13–5 SoCon)
- Head coach: Steve Forbes (4th season)
- Assistant coaches: Jason Shay; Brooks Savage; BJ McKie
- Home arena: Freedom Hall Civic Center

2018–19 Southern Conference men's basketball standings
	Conf.				Overall
Team	W		L	PCT	W		L	PCT
No. 19 Wofford †	18	–	0	1.000	30	–	5	.857
UNC Greensboro	15	–	3	.833	29	–	7	.806
Furman	13	–	5	.722	25	–	8	.758
East Tennessee State	13	–	5	.722	24	–	10	.706
Chattanooga	7	–	11	.389	12	–	20	.375
Mercer	6	–	12	.333	11	–	20	.355
Samford	6	–	12	.333	17	–	16	.515
VMI	4	–	14	.222	11	–	21	.344
Western Carolina	4	–	14	.222	7	–	25	.219
The Citadel	4	–	14	.222	12	–	18	.400
† 2019 SoCon tournament winner Rankings from AP poll

The 2018–19 East Tennessee Buccaneers basketball team represented East Tennessee State University during the 2018–19 NCAA Division I men's basketball season. The Buccaneers, led by fourth-year head coach Steve Forbes, played their home games at the Freedom Hall Civic Center in Johnson City, Tennessee as of the Southern Conference. They finished the season 24–10, 13–5 in SoCon play to finish in a tie for third place. They defeated Chattanooga in the quarterfinals of the SoCon tournament before losing in the semifinals to Wofford. They were invited to the CollegeInsider.com Tournament where they lost in the first round to Green Bay.

== Previous season ==
The Buccaneers finished the 2017–18 season 25–9, 14–4 in SoCon play to finish in second place. They defeated Chattanooga and Furman to advance to the championship game of the SoCon tournament where they lost to UNC Greensboro. Despite having 25 wins, they did not participate in a postseason tournament.

== Roster ==
2018–19 East Tennessee State Buccaneers men's basketball team
Players
Coaches

Pos.	#	Name	Height	Weight	Year	Hometown
G	1	Tray Boyd III	6 ft 4 in (1.93 m)	185 lb (84 kg)	Jr	Memphis, Tennessee
F	2	D'Andre Bernard	6 ft 8 in (2.03 m)	190 lb (86 kg)	Jr	Toronto, Ontario, Canada
G	3	Bo Hodges	6 ft 4 in (1.93 m)	200 lb (91 kg)	So	Nashville, Tennessee
G	4	Daivien Williamson	6 ft 2 in (1.88 m)	155 lb (70 kg)	Fr	Winston-Salem, North Carolina
G	5	Carlos Curtis	6 ft 2 in (1.88 m)	185 lb (84 kg)	RS Fr	Milwaukee, Wisconsin
G	10	Patrick Good	6 ft 0 in (1.83 m)	195 lb (88 kg)	So	Johnson City, Tennessee
F	11	Jeromy Rodriguez	6 ft 7 in (2.01 m)	225 lb (102 kg)	Jr	Santiago, Dominican Republic
G	12	Tre Tiller	6 ft 3 in (1.91 m)	185 lb (84 kg)	Jr	Chattanooga, Tennessee
C	13	Octavion Corley	7 ft 0 in (2.13 m)	195 lb (88 kg)	Jr	Reno, Nevada
G	15	Isaiah Tisdale	6 ft 1 in (1.85 m)	185 lb (84 kg)	Jr	Lexington, Kentucky
F	20	James Harrison, Jr.	6 ft 8 in (2.03 m)	230 lb (104 kg)	Sr	Dallas, Texas
F	21	Kevon Tucker	6 ft 3 in (1.91 m)	200 lb (91 kg)	Jr	Dacula, Georgia
G	23	Myles Rasnick	6 ft 1 in (1.85 m)	150 lb (68 kg)	Fr	Knoxville, Tennessee
C	25	Lucas N'Guessan	7 ft 0 in (2.13 m)	220 lb (100 kg)	Jr	De Lier, Netherlands
F	33	Mladen Armus	6 ft 10 in (2.08 m)	240 lb (109 kg)	So	Belgrade, Serbia

Head coach

- Steve Forbes

Assistant coach(es)

- Jason Shay
- Brooks Savage
- BJ McKie

Legend

- (C) Team captain
- (S) Suspended
- (I) Ineligible
- (W) Walk-on
- Injured
- Current redshirt

Roster
Last update: October 18, 2018

== Schedule and results ==
Date time, TV	Rank^{#}	Opponent^{#}	Result	Record	Site (attendance) city, state
Exhibition
Nov 2, 2018*; 7:00 pm		Southern Wesleyan	W 85–38		Freedom Hall Civic Center (3,391); Johnson City, TN
Regular season
Nov 6, 2018*; 7:00 pm, ESPN+		at Georgia State; Cayman Islands Classic campus game	L 68–74	0–1	GSU Sports Arena (1,688); Atlanta, GA
Nov 8, 2018*; 7:00 pm, ESPN+		Hiwassee	W 109–44	1–1	Freedom Hall Civic Center (3,539); Johnson City, TN
Nov 11, 2018*; 1:30 pm, FS1		at Creighton; Cayman Islands Classic campus game	L 69–75	1–2	CHI Health Center Omaha (16,506); Omaha, NE
Nov 17, 2018*; 2:30 pm, ESPN+		at Winthrop	W 76–74	2–2	Winthrop Coliseum; Rock Hill, SC
Nov 19, 2018*; 7:00 pm, ESPN+		Chicago State; Cayman Islands Classic Mainland semifinals	W 86–61	3–2	Freedom Hall Civic Center (3,325); Johnson City, TN
Nov 20, 2018*; 7:00 pm, ESPN+		Sam Houston State; Cayman Islands Classic Mainland championship	W 77–63	4–2	Freedom Hall Civic Center (3,203); Johnson City, TN
Nov 24, 2018*; 4:00 pm, ESPN+		North Dakota State	W 79–61	5–2	Freedom Hall Civic Center (3,610); Johnson City, TN
Nov 27, 2018*; 7:00 pm, ESPN+		at Georgia Southern	W 69–64	6–2	Hanner Fieldhouse (2,256); Statesboro, GA
Dec 1, 2018; 7:00 pm, ESPN+		at Wofford	L 62–79	6–3 (0–1)	Jerry Richardson Indoor Stadium (2,014); Spartanburg, SC
Dec 3, 2018*; 7:00 pm, ESPN3		Reinhardt	W 107–60	7–3	Freedom Hall Civic Center (3,493); Johnson City, TN
Dec 8, 2018*; 7:00 pm, ESPN+		UT Martin	W 80–62	8–3	Freedom Hall Civic Center (4,210); Johnson City, TN
Dec 15, 2018*; 2:00 pm, BTN Plus		at Illinois	L 55–73	8–4	State Farm Center (12,379); Champaign, IL
Dec 21, 2018*; 7:00 pm		vs. Wyoming; Sun Bowl Invitational semifinals	W 76–53	9–4	Don Haskins Center (4,284); El Paso, TX
Dec 22, 2018*; 9:00 pm		vs. Norfolk State; Sun Bowl Invitational championship game	W 89–61	10–4	Don Haskins Center (4,011); El Paso, TX
Dec 29, 2018; 4:00 pm, ESPN+		Furman	W 79–56	11–4 (1–1)	Freedom Hall Civic Center (5,439); Johnson City, TN
Jan 3, 2019; 7:00 pm, ESPN3		Samford	W 81–72 ^{OT}	12–4 (2–1)	Freedom Hall Civic Center (4,316); Johnson City, TN
Jan 5, 2019; 4:00 pm, ESPN+		Chattanooga	W 96–70	13–4 (3–1)	Freedom Hall Civic Center (5,011); Johnson City, TN
Jan 10, 2019; 7:00 pm, ESPN+		at The Citadel	W 98–73	14–4 (4–1)	McAlister Field House (1,253); Charleston, SC
Jan 12, 2019; 4:30 pm, ESPN3		at Mercer	W 72–68 ^{OT}	15–4 (5–1)	Hawkins Arena (3,227); Macon, GA
Jan 17, 2019; 7:00 pm, ESPN+		VMI	W 85–82	16–4 (6–1)	Freedom Hall Civic Center (4,286); Johnson City, TN
Jan 19, 2019; 4:00 pm, ESPN3		UNC Greensboro	L 68–75	16–5 (6–2)	Freedom Hall Civic Center (5,702); Johnson City, TN
Jan 26, 2019; 7:00 pm, ESPN3		at Western Carolina	W 91–69	17–5 (7–2)	Ramsey Center (2,095); Cullowhee, NC
Jan 31, 2019; 7:30 pm, ESPN3		at Samford	W 74–66	18–5 (8–2)	Pete Hanna Center (987); Homewood, AL
Feb 2, 2019; 4:30 pm, ESPN3		at Chattanooga	W 77–64	19–5 (9–2)	McKenzie Arena (4,553); Chattanooga, TN
Feb 7, 2019; 7:00 pm, ESPN+		Wofford	L 76–78 ^{OT}	19–6 (9–3)	Freedom Hall Civic Center (5,911); Johnson City, TN
Feb 9, 2019; 4:00 pm, ESPN+		at Furman	L 61–91	19–7 (9–4)	Timmons Arena (2,500); Greenville, SC
Feb 14, 2019; 7:00 pm, ESPN3		The Citadel	W 91–83	20–7 (10–4)	Freedom Hall Civic Center (3,723); Johnson City, TN
Feb 16, 2019; 4:00 pm, ESPN3		Mercer	W 88–69	21–7 (11–4)	Freedom Hall Civic Center (5,146); Johnson City, TN
Feb 21, 2019; 7:00 pm, ESPN+		at VMI	W 94–70	22–7 (12–4)	Cameron Hall (715); Lexington, VA
Feb 24, 2019; 3:00 pm, ESPN+		at UNC Greensboro	L 59–60	22–8 (12–5)	Greensboro Coliseum (6,021); Greensboro, NC
Mar 2, 2019; 4:00 pm, ESPN+		Western Carolina	W 81–74	23–8 (13–5)	Freedom Hall Civic Center (5,520); Johnson City, TN
SoCon tournament
March 9, 2019; 2:30 pm, ESPN+	(4)	vs. (5) Chattanooga; Quarterfinals	W 68–64	24–8	U.S. Cellular Center (5,443); Asheville, NC
March 10, 2019; 4:00 pm, ESPN+	(4)	vs. (1) Wofford; Semifinals	L 72–81	24–9	U.S. Cellular Center (6,273); Asheville, NC
CollegeInsider.com Postseason tournament
March 20, 2019*; 7:00 pm, CBS Sports Live		Green Bay; First round – Hugh Durham Classic	L 94–102	24–10	Freedom Hall Civic Center (2,817); Johnson City, TN
*Non-conference game. ^{#}Rankings from AP Poll. (#) Tournament seedings in parentheses. E=East Region. All times are in Eastern Time.
