= 2018–19 Mercer Bears men's basketball team =

American college basketball season

2018–19 Mercer Bears men's basketball
- Conference: Southern Conference
- Record: 11–20 (6–12 SoCon)
- Head coach: Bob Hoffman (11th season)
- Assistant coaches: Jarred Merrill; Paul Mrozik; Philip Pearson
- Home arena: Hawkins Arena

2018–19 Southern Conference men's basketball standings
	Conf.				Overall
Team	W		L	PCT	W		L	PCT
No. 19 Wofford †	18	–	0	1.000	30	–	5	.857
UNC Greensboro	15	–	3	.833	29	–	7	.806
Furman	13	–	5	.722	25	–	8	.758
East Tennessee State	13	–	5	.722	24	–	10	.706
Chattanooga	7	–	11	.389	12	–	20	.375
Mercer	6	–	12	.333	11	–	20	.355
Samford	6	–	12	.333	17	–	16	.515
VMI	4	–	14	.222	11	–	21	.344
Western Carolina	4	–	14	.222	7	–	25	.219
The Citadel	4	–	14	.222	12	–	18	.400
† 2019 SoCon tournament winner Rankings from AP poll

The 2018–19 Mercer Bears men's basketball team represented Mercer University during the 2018–19 NCAA Division I men's basketball season. The Bears, led by 11th-year head coach Bob Hoffman, played their home games at Hawkins Arena on the university's Macon, Georgia campus as fifth-year members of the Southern Conference (SoCon).

== Previous season ==
The Bears finished the 2017–18 season 19–15, 11–7 in SoCon play, to finish in a tie for fourth place. They lost in the quarterfinals of the SoCon tournament to Wofford. They were invited to the College Basketball Invitational where they defeated Grand Canyon in the first round before losing in the quarterfinals to North Texas.

== Roster ==
2018–19 Mercer Bears men's basketball team
Players
Coaches

Pos.	#	Name	Height	Weight	Year	Hometown
G	0	Djordje Dimitrijevic	6 ft 2 in (1.88 m)	180 lb (82 kg)	Jr	Grdelica, Serbia
F	1	Cory Kilby	6 ft 7 in (2.01 m)	205 lb (93 kg)	Sr	Ada, OK
G	2	Jaylen Stowe	6 ft 4 in (1.93 m)	220 lb (100 kg)	RS Sr	Harrisburg, NC
G	3	Marcus Cohen	6 ft 4 in (1.93 m)	190 lb (86 kg)	So	Tampa, FL
G	5	DJ Peavy	6 ft 3 in (1.91 m)	185 lb (84 kg)	Fr	San Antonio, TX
G	10	Daniel Love	6 ft 3 in (1.91 m)	170 lb (77 kg)	Fr	Orlando, FL
F	11	Fardaws Aimaq	6 ft 11 in (2.11 m)	245 lb (111 kg)	Fr	Vancouver, BC
G	12	Mitch Prendergast	6 ft 0 in (1.83 m)	190 lb (86 kg)	RS Fr	Dallas, TX
G	15	CJ Williamson	6 ft 3 in (1.91 m)	190 lb (86 kg)	Fr	Guntersville, AL
G	20	Ross Cummings	6 ft 3 in (1.91 m)	180 lb (82 kg)	Jr	Dickson, TN
G	22	Ethan Stair	6 ft 4 in (1.93 m)	205 lb (93 kg)	RS Jr	Hazel Green, AL
F	23	Brandon Thomas	6 ft 3 in (1.91 m)	200 lb (91 kg)	Fr	McDonough, GA
F	25	Maciej Bender	6 ft 11 in (2.11 m)	255 lb (116 kg)	Jr	Warsaw, Poland
F	30	Luke Hamilton	6 ft 8 in (2.03 m)	200 lb (91 kg)	Fr	Austin, TX
F	33	Breck Cuddy	7 ft 0 in (2.13 m)	215 lb (98 kg)	Fr	Vestavia Hills, AL
F	35	Patrick Urey	6 ft 6 in (1.98 m)	210 lb (95 kg)	RS Fr	Chattanooga, TN
C	55	Victor Baffuto	6 ft 10 in (2.08 m)	215 lb (98 kg)	RS So	Brasília, Brazil

Head coach

- Bob Hoffman (Oklahoma Baptist)

Assistant coach(es)

- Jarred Merrill (Oklahoma Christian)
- Paul Mrozik (Western Nebraska)
- Philip Pearson (Alabama)

Legend

- (C) Team captain
- (S) Suspended
- (I) Ineligible
- (W) Walk-on
- Injured
- Current redshirt

Roster
Last update: September 27, 2024

== Schedule and results ==
Date time, TV	Rank^{#}	Opponent^{#}	Result	Record	Site (attendance) city, state
Regular season
November 6, 2018*; 8:00 p.m.		at UAB	L 67–75	0–1	Bartow Arena (3,185); Birmingham, AL
November 9, 2018*; 7:00 p.m., ESPN3		Piedmont	W 105–52	1–1	Hawkins Arena; Macon, GA
November 13, 2018*; 7:00 p.m., ESPN+		at Georgia State	L 60–62	1–2	GSU Sports Arena (1,579); Atlanta, GA
November 16, 2018*; 7:00 p.m., ESPN+		UT Martin	W 77–60	2–2	Hawkins Arena (2,705); Macon, GA
November 20, 2018*; 7:00 p.m., ESPN+		Maryland Eastern Shore	W 80–42	3–2	Hawkins Arena (2,589); Macon, GA
November 24, 2018*; 2:00 p.m., ACCN Extra		at NC State	L 74–78	3–3	PNC Arena (12,828); Raleigh, NC
November 27, 2018*; 7:00 p.m., ESPN+		Brewton–Parker	W 90–65	4–3	Hawkins Arena (2,374); Macon, GA
December 1, 2018; 2:00 p.m., ESPN+		at The Citadel	L 69-79	4–4 (0–1)	McAlister Field House (765); Charleston, SC
December 5, 2018*; 7:00 p.m.		at Florida Atlantic	L 64–68	4–5	FAU Arena (1,492); Boca Raton, FL
December 8, 2018*; 4:00 p.m., ESPN+		Georgia Southern	L 74–89	4–6	Hawkins Arena (3,272); Macon, GA
December 18, 2018*; 8:00 p.m., SECN		at Florida	L 63–71	4–7	O'Connell Center (8,043); Gainesville, FL
December 21, 2018*; 7:00 p.m., ESPN+		UNC Wilmington	W 77–73	5–7	Hawkins Arena (2,219); Macon, GA
December 29, 2018*; 1:30 p.m.		vs. Harvard	L 67–71	5–8	State Farm Arena (2,504); Atlanta, GA
January 3, 2019; 7:00 p.m., ESPN+		at Furman	L 58–71	5–9 (0–2)	Timmons Arena (1,753); Greenville, SC
January 5, 2019; 7:00 p.m., ESPN3		at Wofford	L 74–78	5–10 (0–3)	Jerry Richardson Indoor Stadium (2,681); Spartanburg, SC
January 10, 2019; 7:00 p.m., ESPN+		Western Carolina	W 84–80	6–10 (1–3)	Hawkins Arena (2,521); Macon, GA
January 12, 2019; 4:30 p.m., ESPN+		East Tennessee State	L 68–72 ^{OT}	6–11 (1–4)	Hawkins Arena (3,227); Macon, GA
January 17, 2019; 8:00 p.m., ESPN3		at Chattanooga	L 70–73	6–12 (1–5)	McKenzie Arena (3,769); Chattanooga, TN
January 19, 2019; 3:00 p.m., ESPN3		at Samford	W 93–87	7–12 (2–5)	Pete Hanna Center (1,391); Homewood, AL
January 24, 2019; 7:30 p.m., ESPN+		VMI	W 88–68	8–12 (3–5)	Hawkins Arena (2,376); Macon, GA
January 26, 2019; 5:00 p.m., ESPN+		at UNC Greensboro	L 81–88	8–13 (3–6)	Greensboro Coliseum (2,928); Greensboro, NC
January 31, 2019; 7:00 p.m., ESPN+		Wofford	L 67–76	8–14 (3–7)	Hawkins Arena (2,517); Macon, GA
February 2, 2019; 4:00 p.m., ESPN+		Furman	L 63–74	8–15 (3–8)	Hawkins Arena (3,027); Macon, GA
February 9, 2019; 4:00 p.m., ESPN+		The Citadel	L 61–67	8–16 (3–9)	Hawkins Arena (2,185); Macon, GA
February 14, 2019; 7:00 p.m., ESPN+		at Western Carolina	W 74–65	9–16 (4–9)	Ramsey Center (1,203); Cullowhee, NC
February 16, 2019; 4:00 p.m., ESPN3		at East Tennessee State	L 69–88	9–17 (4–10)	Freedom Hall Civic Center (5,146); Johnson City, TN
February 21, 2019; 7:00 p.m., ESPN+		Samford	W 65–62	10–17 (5–10)	Hawkins Arena (1,727); Macon, GA
February 23, 2019; 4:00 p.m., ESPN+		Chattanooga	W 74–69	11–17 (6–10)	Hawkins Arena (3,227); Macon, GA
February 28, 2019; 7:00 p.m., ESPN3		at VMI	L 71–84	11–18 (6–11)	Cameron Hall (833); Lexington, VA
March 2, 2019; 4:30 p.m., ESPN+		UNC Greensboro	L 47–74	11–19 (6–12)	Hawkins Arena (1,406); Macon, GA
SoCon tournament
March 8–11, 2019; 8:30 p.m., ESPN3	(6)	vs. (3) Furman; First round	L 74–85	11–20	U.S. Cellular Center (2,916); Asheville, NC
*Non-conference game. ^{#}Rankings from AP poll. (#) Tournament seedings in parentheses. All times are in Eastern.
