= 2018–19 Wofford Terriers men's basketball team =

American college basketball season

2018–19 Wofford Terriers men's basketball

Southern Conference regular season and tournament champions

NCAA tournament, Second Round
- Conference: Southern Conference

Ranking
- Coaches: No. 18
- AP: No. 19
- Record: 30–5 (18–0 SoCon)
- Head coach: Mike Young (17th season)
- Assistant coaches: Jay McAuley; Kevin Giltner; Will Murphy
- Home arena: Jerry Richardson Indoor Stadium

2018–19 Southern Conference men's basketball standings
	Conf.				Overall
Team	W		L	PCT	W		L	PCT
No. 19 Wofford †	18	–	0	1.000	30	–	5	.857
UNC Greensboro	15	–	3	.833	29	–	7	.806
Furman	13	–	5	.722	25	–	8	.758
East Tennessee State	13	–	5	.722	24	–	10	.706
Chattanooga	7	–	11	.389	12	–	20	.375
Mercer	6	–	12	.333	11	–	20	.355
Samford	6	–	12	.333	17	–	16	.515
VMI	4	–	14	.222	11	–	21	.344
Western Carolina	4	–	14	.222	7	–	25	.219
The Citadel	4	–	14	.222	12	–	18	.400
† 2019 SoCon tournament winner Rankings from AP poll

The 2018–19 Wofford Terriers men's basketball team represented Wofford College during the 2018–19 NCAA Division I men's basketball season. The Terriers, led by 17th-year head coach Mike Young, played their home games at the newly opened Jerry Richardson Indoor Stadium in Spartanburg, South Carolina as members of the Southern Conference.

On February 25, 2019, the Terriers entered the AP Poll at No. 24. This was Wofford's first AP Poll appearance in program history.

They finished the season 30–5, and 18–0 in SoCon play, to win the regular season championship. They defeated VMI, East Tennessee State, and UNC Greensboro to be champions of the SoCon tournament. They received the SoCon's automatic-bid to the NCAA tournament where they defeated Seton Hall in the first round before losing in the second round to Kentucky.

== Previous season ==
The Terriers finished the 2017–18 season 21–13, 11–7 in SoCon play to finish in a tie for fourth place. They defeated Mercer in the quarterfinals of the SoCon tournament to advance to the semifinals where they lost to UNC Greensboro. They were invited to the CollegeInsider.com Tournament where, after a first round bye, they lost in the second round to Central Michigan.

== Roster ==
2018–19 Wofford Terriers men's basketball team
Players
Coaches

Pos.	#	Name	Height	Weight	Year	Hometown
F	1	Chevez Goodwin	6 ft 9 in (2.06 m)	225 lb (102 kg)	So	Blythewood, SC
F/C	2	Michael Manning Jr.	6 ft 9 in (2.06 m)	210 lb (95 kg)	So	Memphis, TN
G	3	Fletcher Magee	6 ft 4 in (1.93 m)	200 lb (91 kg)	Sr	Orlando, FL
G	4	Isaiah Bigelow	6 ft 7 in (2.01 m)	185 lb (84 kg)	Fr	Greensboro, NC
G	5	Storm Murphy	5 ft 11 in (1.8 m)	180 lb (82 kg)	So	Middleton, WI
G	10	Nathan Hoover	6 ft 4 in (1.93 m)	185 lb (84 kg)	Jr	Memphis, TN
G	11	Ryan Larson	6 ft 1 in (1.85 m)	175 lb (79 kg)	Fr	St. Paul, MN
G	12	Alex Michael	6 ft 6 in (1.98 m)	205 lb (93 kg)	Fr	Greensboro, NC
G	14	Drew Cottrell	6 ft 4 in (1.93 m)	190 lb (86 kg)	Fr	Flowery Branch, GA
G	15	Trevor Stumpe	6 ft 5 in (1.96 m)	215 lb (98 kg)	Jr	Plainfield, IL
G	21	Tray Hollowell	6 ft 2 in (1.88 m)	185 lb (84 kg)	So	Hopkinsville, KY
F	24	Keve Aluma	6 ft 9 in (2.06 m)	230 lb (104 kg)	So	Berlin, MD
F	25	Messiah Jones	6 ft 6 in (1.98 m)	215 lb (98 kg)	Fr	Chicago, IL
G	31	Donovan Theme-Love	6 ft 1 in (1.85 m)	190 lb (86 kg)	Jr	Providence, RI
F	33	Cameron Jackson	6 ft 8 in (2.03 m)	250 lb (113 kg)	Sr	Winchester, VA
C	50	Matthew Pegram	6 ft 11 in (2.11 m)	260 lb (118 kg)	Sr	Mt. Pleasant, SC

Head coach

- Mike Young (Emory & Henry)

Assistant coach(es)

- Jay McAuley (Georgia)
- Kevin Giltner (Wofford)
- Will Murphy (Wake Forest)

Legend

- (C) Team captain
- (S) Suspended
- (I) Ineligible
- (W) Walk-on
- Injured
- Current redshirt

Roster
Last update: October 24, 2018

== Schedule and results ==
Date time, TV	Rank^{#}	Opponent^{#}	Result	Record	Site (attendance) city, state
Regular season
November 6, 2018*; 7:00 pm, ESPN2		No. 8 North Carolina	L 67–78	0–1	Jerry Richardson Indoor Stadium (3,400); Spartanburg, SC
November 10, 2018*; 2:00 pm, ESPN+		at High Point	W 68–60	1–1	Millis Center (1,342); High Point, NC
November 13, 2018*; 7:00 pm		Carver College	W 94–35	2–1	Jerry Richardson Indoor Stadium (1,412); Spartanburg, SC
November 16, 2018*; 7:00 pm, P12N		at Stanford; Battle 4 Atlantis campus-site game	Cancelled (Wildfires)		Maples Pavilion; Stanford, CA
November 18, 2018*; 2:00 pm, FSOK		at Oklahoma; Battle 4 Atlantis	L 64–75	2–2	Lloyd Noble Center (8,432); Norman, OK
November 21, 2018*; 7:00 pm, ESPN3		Coppin State; Battle 4 Atlantis	W 99–65	3–2	Jerry Richardson Indoor Stadium (1,480); Spartanburg, SC
November 23, 2018*; 1:00 pm		Mars Hill; Battle 4 Atlantis	W 97–46	4–2	Jerry Richardson Indoor Stadium (1,435); Spartanburg, SC
November 26, 2018*; 7:00 pm, SECN+		at South Carolina	W 81–61	5–2	Colonial Life Arena (10,561); Columbia, SC
December 1, 2018; 7:00 pm, ESPN+		East Tennessee State	W 79–62	6–2 (1–0)	Jerry Richardson Indoor Stadium (2,014); Spartanburg, SC
December 4, 2018*; 7:00 pm, ESPN+		at No. 2 Kansas	L 47–72	6–3	Allen Fieldhouse (16,300); Lawrence, KS
December 6, 2018*; 7:00 pm		Kentucky Christian	W 112–58	7–3	Jerry Richardson Indoor Stadium (1,406); Spartanburg, SC
December 9, 2018*; 2:00 pm, ESPN+		Coastal Carolina	W 82–71	8–3	Jerry Richardson Indoor Stadium (1,473); Spartanburg, SC
December 15, 2018*; 7:00 pm, ESPN+		UNC Asheville	W 92–49	9–3	Jerry Richardson Indoor Stadium (1,555); Spartanburg, SC
December 19, 2018*; 8:00 pm, SECN+		at No. 17 Mississippi State	L 87–98	9–4	Humphrey Coliseum (6,443); Starkville, MS
December 29, 2018; 12:00 pm, ESPN+		at Western Carolina	W 74–54	10–4 (2–0)	Ramsey Center (1,043); Cullowhee, NC
January 3, 2019; 7:00 pm, ESPN+		The Citadel	W 112–81	11–4 (3–0)	Jerry Richardson Indoor Stadium (3,400); Spartanburg, SC
January 5, 2019; 7:00 pm, ESPN3/CW62		Mercer	W 78–74	12–4 (4–0)	Jerry Richardson Indoor Stadium (2,681); Spartanburg, SC
January 10, 2019; 7:00 pm, ESPN3		at UNC Greensboro	W 72–43	13–4 (5–0)	Greensboro Coliseum (2,974); Greensboro, NC
January 12, 2019; 1:00 pm, ESPN+		at VMI	W 90–76	14–4 (6–0)	Cameron Hall (700); Lexington, VA
January 19, 2019; 7:00 pm, ESPN3/CW62		Furman	W 59–54	15–4 (7–0)	Jerry Richardson Indoor Stadium (3,400); Spartanburg, SC
January 24, 2019; 7:00 pm, ESPN+		Samford	W 107–106 ^{OT}	16–4 (8–0)	Jerry Richardson Indoor Stadium (2,010); Spartanburg, SC
January 26, 2019; 7:00 pm, ESPN+/CW62		Chattanooga	W 80–69	17–4 (9–0)	Jerry Richardson Indoor Stadium (3,400); Spartanburg, SC
January 31, 2019; 7:00 pm, ESPN+		at Mercer	W 76–67	18–4 (10–0)	Hawkins Arena (2,517); Macon, GA
February 2, 2019; 7:00 pm, ESPN3/CW62		at The Citadel	W 99–61	19–4 (11–0)	McAlister Field House (1,224); Charleston, SC
February 7, 2019; 7:00 pm, ESPN+		at East Tennessee State	W 78–76 ^{OT}	20–4 (12–0)	Freedom Hall Civic Center (5,911); Johnson City, TN
February 9, 2019; 7:00 pm, ESPN+		Western Carolina	W 83–56	21–4 (13–0)	Jerry Richardson Indoor Stadium (3,400); Spartanburg, SC
February 14, 2019; 7:00 pm, ESPN+		VMI	W 95–84	22–4 (14–0)	Jerry Richardson Indoor Stadium (2,014); Spartanburg, SC
February 16, 2019; 7:00 pm, ESPN+/CW62		UNC Greensboro	W 80–50	23–4 (15–0)	Jerry Richardson Indoor Stadium (3,400); Spartanburg, SC
February 23, 2019; 4:00 pm, ESPN3		at Furman	W 72–64	24–4 (16–0)	Timmons Arena (2,508); Greenville, SC
February 28, 2019; 7:00 pm, ESPN+	No. 24	at Chattanooga	W 80–54	25–4 (17–0)	McKenzie Arena (2,909); Chattanooga, TN
March 2, 2019; 1:00 pm, ESPN3	No. 24	at Samford	W 85–64	26–4 (18–0)	Pete Hanna Center (1,655); Homewood, AL
SoCon tournament
March 9, 2019; 12:00 pm, ESPN+	(1) No. 22	vs. (8) VMI; Quarterfinals	W 99–72	27–4	U.S. Cellular Center (5,443); Asheville, NC
March 10, 2019; 4:00 pm, ESPN+	(1) No. 22	vs. (4) East Tennessee State; Semifinals	W 81–72	28–4	U.S. Cellular Center (6,273); Asheville, NC
Mar 11, 2019; 7:00 pm, ESPN	(1) No. 20	vs. (2) UNC Greensboro; Championship	W 70–58	29–4	U.S. Cellular Center (6,400); Asheville, NC
NCAA tournament
March 21, 2019; 9:40 pm, CBS	(7 MW) No. 19	vs. (10 MW) Seton Hall; First Round	W 84–68	30–4	VyStar Veterans Memorial Arena (13,495); Jacksonville, FL
March 23, 2019; 2:40 pm, CBS	(7 MW) No. 19	vs. (2 MW) No. 7 Kentucky; Second Round	L 56–62	30–5	VyStar Veterans Memorial Arena (14,250); Jacksonville, FL
*Non-conference game. ^{#}Rankings from AP Poll. (#) Tournament seedings in parentheses. MW=Midwest. All times are in Eastern Time.
