= 2018–19 Furman Paladins men's basketball team =

American college basketball season

2018–19 Furman Paladins men's basketball

NIT, First round
- Conference: Southern Conference
- Record: 25–8 (13–5 SoCon)
- Head coach: Bob Richey (2nd season)
- Assistant coaches: Tyler Murray; Dwight Perry; Jimmie Williams
- Home arena: Timmons Arena

2018–19 Southern Conference men's basketball standings
	Conf.				Overall
Team	W		L	PCT	W		L	PCT
No. 19 Wofford †	18	–	0	1.000	30	–	5	.857
UNC Greensboro	15	–	3	.833	29	–	7	.806
Furman	13	–	5	.722	25	–	8	.758
East Tennessee State	13	–	5	.722	24	–	10	.706
Chattanooga	7	–	11	.389	12	–	20	.375
Mercer	6	–	12	.333	11	–	20	.355
Samford	6	–	12	.333	17	–	16	.515
VMI	4	–	14	.222	11	–	21	.344
Western Carolina	4	–	14	.222	7	–	25	.219
The Citadel	4	–	14	.222	12	–	18	.400
† 2019 SoCon tournament winner Rankings from AP poll

The 2018–19 Furman Paladins men's basketball team represented Furman University during the 2018–19 NCAA Division I men's basketball season. The Paladins, led by second-year head coach Bob Richey, played their home games at Timmons Arena in Greenville, South Carolina as members of the Southern Conference. They finished the season 25–8, 13–5 in Socon play to finish in a tie for second place. They defeated Mercer in the quarterfinals of the SoCon tournament before losing in the semifinals to UNC Greensboro. They received an at-large bid to the National Invitation Tournament where they lost in the first round to Wichita State. This season was the first team in school history to be ranked in the AP Poll.

== Previous season ==
The Paladins finished the 2017–18 season 23–10, 13–5 in SoCon play to finish in third place. They defeated Western Carolina in the quarterfinals of the SoCon tournament before losing in the semifinals to East Tennessee State. Despite having 23 wins, they did not participate in a postseason tournament.

== Roster ==
2018–19 Furman Paladins men's basketball team
Players
Coaches

Pos.	#	Name	Height	Weight	Year	Hometown
G	0	Tre Clark	6 ft 5 in (1.96 m)	194 lb (88 kg)	RS So	Palmetto, Florida
G	1	Jaylon Pugh	6 ft 0 in (1.83 m)	167 lb (76 kg)	Fr	Cartersville, Georgia
F	2	Jalen Williams	6 ft 8 in (2.03 m)	240 lb (109 kg)	RS Jr	Greenville, South Carolina
G	3	Mike Bothwell	6 ft 3 in (1.91 m)	187 lb (85 kg)	Fr	Cleveland Heights, Ohio
F	4	Noah Gurley	6 ft 8 in (2.03 m)	190 lb (86 kg)	RS Fr	Fayetteville, Georgia
G	5	Andrew Brown	6 ft 5 in (1.96 m)	212 lb (96 kg)	Sr	Travelers Rest, South Carolina
G	10	Alex Hunter	5 ft 11 in (1.8 m)	170 lb (77 kg)	So	Raleigh, North Carolina
G	11	Robert Swanson	5 ft 10 in (1.78 m)	160 lb (73 kg)	Fr	Myrtle Beach, South Carolina
G	13	Brady Schuck	6 ft 2 in (1.88 m)	165 lb (75 kg)	Sr	Charleston, South Carolina
F	20	Jalen Slawson	6 ft 7 in (2.01 m)	206 lb (93 kg)	Fr	Summerville, South Carolina
G	23	Jordan Lyons	5 ft 11 in (1.8 m)	203 lb (92 kg)	Jr	Peachtree City, Georgia
F	32	Matt Rafferty	6 ft 8 in (2.03 m)	215 lb (98 kg)	Sr	Hinsdale, Illinois
F	45	Clay Mounce	6 ft 7 in (2.01 m)	200 lb (91 kg)	RS So	Elkin, North Carolina

Head coach

- Bob Richey (North Greenville)

Assistant coach(es)

- Tyler Murray (Hampden–Sydney)
- Dwight Perry (Kentucky)
- Jimmie Williams (MNU)

Legend

- (C) Team captain
- (S) Suspended
- (I) Ineligible
- (W) Walk-on
- Injured
- Current redshirt

Roster
Last update: October 18, 2018

== Schedule and results ==
In its first two road games, Furman had a pair victories over teams that had reached the final four of the 2018 NCAA Division I men's basketball tournament: Loyola on November 9 and defending national champion Villanova on November 17. On December 3, 8–0 Furman became ranked in the AP Poll for the first time in school history.

Date time, TV	Rank^{#}	Opponent^{#}	Result	Record	Site (attendance) city, state
Regular season
November 6, 2018*; 7:00 pm, ESPN+		Bob Jones	W 102–48	1–0	Timmons Arena (1,054); Greenville, SC
November 9, 2018*; 7:00 pm, NBCSC		at Loyola–Chicago	W 60–58	2–0	Joseph J. Gentile Arena (4,963); Chicago, IL
November 13, 2018*; 7:00 pm, ESPN+		Gardner–Webb	W 88–86 ^{OT}	3–0	Timmons Arena (1,104); Greenville, SC
November 15, 2018*; 7:00 pm, ESPN3		North Greenville	W 107–67	4–0	Timmons Arena (1,110); Greenville, SC
November 17, 2018*; 5:00 pm, FS2		at No. 8 Villanova	W 76–68 ^{OT}	5–0	Finneran Pavilion (6,501); Villanova, PA
November 21, 2018*; 6:30 pm, ESPN3		Southern Wesleyan	W 74–57	6–0	Timmons Arena (1,506); Greenville, SC
November 25, 2018*; 4:00 pm, ESPN+		at UNC Asheville	W 65–51	7–0	Kimmel Arena (2,186); Asheville, NC
December 1, 2018; 4:00 pm, ESPN+		Western Carolina	W 90–88 ^{2OT}	8–0 (1–0)	Timmons Arena (2,131); Greenville, SC
December 4, 2018*; 7:00 pm	No. 25	at Elon	W 98–77	9–0	Schar Center (2,017); Elon, NC
December 8, 2018*; 4:30 pm, ESPN+	No. 25	at USC Upstate	W 74–60	10–0	G. B. Hodge Center (833); Spartanburg, SC
December 11, 2018*; 7:00 pm, ESPN3	No. 23	Charleston Southern	W 77–69	11–0	Timmons Arena (2,210); Greenville, SC
December 15, 2018*; 4:00 pm, ESPN+	No. 23	UNC Wilmington	W 93–50	12–0	Timmons Arena (2,457); Greenville, SC
December 21, 2018*; 8:00 pm, SECN+	No. 24	at LSU	L 57–75	12–1	Pete Maravich Assembly Center (9,765); Baton Rouge, LA
December 29, 2018; 4:00 pm, ESPN+		at East Tennessee State	L 56–79	12–2 (1–1)	Freedom Hall Civic Center (5,439); Johnson City, TN
January 3, 2019; 7:00 pm, ESPN+		Mercer	W 71–58	13–2 (2–1)	Timmons Arena (1,753); Greenville, SC
January 5, 2019; 4:00 pm, ESPN3		The Citadel	W 101–85	14–2 (3–1)	Timmons Arena (2,462); Greenville, SC
January 10, 2019; 7:00 pm, ESPN3		at VMI	W 89–57	15–2 (4–1)	Cameron Hall (700); Lexington, VA
January 12, 2019; 5:00 pm, ESPN3		at UNC Greensboro	L 79–89	15–3 (4–2)	Greensboro Coliseum (3,157); Greensboro, NC
January 19, 2019; 5:00 pm, ESPN3		at Wofford	L 54–59	15–4 (4–3)	Jerry Richardson Indoor Stadium (3,400); Spartanburg, SC
January 24, 2019; 7:00 pm, ESPN+		Chattanooga	W 73–58	16–4 (5–3)	Timmons Arena (1,630); Greenville, SC
January 26, 2019; 4:30 pm, ESPN3		Samford	L 73–75	16–5 (5–4)	Timmons Arena (2,300); Greenville, SC
January 31, 2019; 7:00 pm, ESPN+		at The Citadel	W 71–61	17–5 (6–4)	McAlister Field House (1,411); Charleston, SC
February 2, 2019; 4:00 pm, ESPN+		at Mercer	W 74–63	18–5 (7–4)	Hawkins Arena (3,027); Macon, GA
February 7, 2019; 4:00 pm		at Western Carolina	W 64–45	19–5 (8–4)	Ramsey Center (2,423); Cullowhee, NC
February 9, 2019; 4:00 pm, ESPN+		East Tennessee State	W 91–61	20–5 (9–4)	Timmons Arena (2,500); Greenville, SC
February 14, 2019; 4:00 pm, ESPN+		UNC Greensboro	W 67–57	21–5 (10–4)	Timmons Arena (1,719); Greenville, SC
February 16, 2019; 4:30 pm		VMI	W 96–62	22–5 (11–4)	Timmons Arena (2,381); Greenville, SC
February 23, 2019; 4:00 pm, ESPN3		Wofford	L 64–72	22–6 (11–5)	Timmons Arena (2,508); Greenville, SC
February 28, 2019; 4:00 pm, ESPN+		at Samford	W 90–81	23–6 (12–5)	Pete Hanna Center (1,812); Homewood, AL
March 2, 2019; 4:00 pm, ESPN+		at Chattanooga	W 71–50	24–6 (13–5)	McKenzie Arena (3,233); Chattanooga, TN
SoCon tournament
March 9, 2019; 8:30 pm, ESPN+	(3)	vs. (6) Mercer; SoCon Tournament Quarterfinal	W 85–74	25–6	U.S. Cellular Center (2,916); Asheville, NC
March 10, 2019; 6:30 pm, ESPN+	(3)	vs. (2) UNC Greensboro; SoCon Tournament Semifinal	L 62–66	25–7	U.S. Cellular Center (6,273); Asheville, NC
NIT
March 20, 2019*; 7:00 pm, ESPN3	(3)	(6) Wichita State; First round – Indiana bracket	L 70–76	25–8	Timmons Arena (2,102); Greenville, SC
*Non-conference game. ^{#}Rankings from AP Poll. (#) Tournament seedings in parentheses. All times are in Eastern Time.

== Rankings ==
Ranking movements Legend: ██ Increase in ranking ██ Decrease in ranking RV = Received votes
	Week																			
Poll	Pre	1	2	3	4	5	6	7	8	9	10	11	12	13	14	15	16	17	18	Final
AP		RV	RV	RV	25	23	24	RV												Not released
Coaches			RV	RV	RV	RV	25	RV												
