= 2018–19 NCAA Division I men's basketball rankings =

- Season: 2018–19
- NCAA Tournament: 2019
- Preseason No. 1: Kansas
- NCAA Tournament Champions: Virginia
NCAA Division I men's basketball rankings


Two human polls made up the 2018–19 NCAA Division I men's basketball rankings, the AP Poll and the Coaches Poll, in addition to various publications' preseason polls.

== Legend ==
	Increase in ranking
	Decrease in ranking
	New to rankings from previous week
Italics	Number of first place votes
(#–#)	Win–loss record
т	Tied with team above or below also with this symbol

== AP Poll ==
	Preseason Oct 22	Week 2 Nov 12	Week 3 Nov 19	Week 4 Nov 26	Week 5 Dec 3	Week 6 Dec 10	Week 7 Dec 17	Week 8 Dec. 24	Week 9 Dec. 31	Week 10 Jan. 7	Week 11 Jan. 14	Week 12 Jan. 21	Week 13 Jan. 28	Week 14 Feb. 4	Week 15 Feb. 11	Week 16 Feb. 18	Week 17 Feb. 25	Week 18 Mar. 4	Week 19 Mar. 11	Week 20 Mar. 18	
1.	Kansas (37)	Duke (2–0) (48)	Duke (3–0) (53)	Gonzaga (6–0) (32)	Gonzaga (8–0) (43)	Kansas (8–0) (57)	Kansas (9–0) (56)	Duke (11–1) (35)	Duke (11–1) (35)	Duke (12–1) (37)	Duke (14–1) (36)	Tennessee (16–1) (48)	Tennessee (18–1) (48)	Tennessee (20–1) (48)	Tennessee (22–1) (40)	Duke (23–2) (58)	Gonzaga (27–2) (44)	Gonzaga (29–2) (42)	Gonzaga (29–2) (41)	Duke (29–5) (58)	1.
2.	Kentucky (19)	Kansas (1–0) (14)	Kansas (3–0) (7)	Kansas (5–0) (31)	Kansas (8–0) (19)	Duke (9–1) (4)	Duke (9–1) (5)	Michigan (12–0) (9)	Michigan (13–0) (9)	Michigan (15–0) (9)	Michigan (17–0) (9)	Duke (15–2) (11)	Duke (17–2) (12)	Duke (19–2) (12)	Duke (21–2) (24)	Gonzaga (25–2) (6)	Virginia (24–2) (15)	Virginia (26–2) (21)	Virginia (28–2) (23)	Virginia (29–3) (5)	2.
3.	Gonzaga (1)	Gonzaga (2–0)	Gonzaga (3–0)	Duke (5–1) (1)	Duke (7–1) (1)	Tennessee (7–1)	Tennessee (8–1) (2)	Tennessee (10–1) (12)	Tennessee (11–1) (12)	Tennessee (12–1) (13)	Tennessee (14–1) (13)	Virginia (16–1) (3)	Virginia (18–1) (4)	Virginia (20–1) (4)	Gonzaga (23–2)	Virginia (22–2)	Duke (24–3) (3)	North Carolina (24–5)	North Carolina (26–5)	North Carolina (27–6)	3.
4.	Duke (4)	Virginia (2–0) (2)	Virginia (3–0) (2)	Virginia (6–0) (1)	Virginia (7–0) (10)	Gonzaga (9–1)	Michigan (11–0) (1)	Virginia (11–0) (4)	Virginia (11–0) (4)	Virginia (13–0) (5)	Virginia (15–0) (6)	Gonzaga (18–2)	Gonzaga (19–2)	Gonzaga (21–2)	Virginia (20–2)	Kentucky (21–4)	Kentucky (23–4) (2)	Duke (25–4) (1)	Kentucky (26–5)	Gonzaga (30–3)	4.
5.	Virginia (2)	Tennessee (2–0) (1)	Tennessee (3–0) (1)	Nevada (6–0)	Michigan (8–0)	Michigan (10–0)	Virginia (11–0) (1)	Kansas (10–1) (4)	Kansas (11–1) (4)	Gonzaga (14–2)	Gonzaga (16–2)	Michigan (17–1)	Michigan (19-1)	Kentucky (18–3)	Kentucky (20–3)	Tennessee (23–2)	North Carolina (22–5)	Tennessee (26–3)	Duke (26–5)	Michigan State (28–6)	5.
6.	Tennessee (1)	Nevada (2–0)	Nevada (3–0)	Tennessee (4–1)	Nevada (8–0)	Virginia (9–0)	Nevada (11–0)	Nevada (12–0)	Nevada (13–0)	Michigan State (13–2)	Michigan State (15–2)	Michigan State (16–2) (2)	Michigan State (18–3)	Nevada (21–1)	Michigan (22–2)	Nevada (24–1)	Michigan State (23–5)	Kentucky (24–5)	Michigan State (25–6)	Tennessee (29–5)	6.
7.	Nevada	North Carolina (2–0)	North Carolina (4–0)	Michigan (6–0)	Tennessee (6–1)	Nevada (10–0)	Auburn (9–1)	Gonzaga (11–2)	Gonzaga (12–2)	Kansas (12–2)	Kansas (14–2)	Nevada (18–1)	Kentucky (16–3)	Michigan (20–2)	Nevada (23–1)	Michigan (23–3)	Tennessee (24–3)	Michigan (26–4)	Texas Tech (26–5)	Kentucky (27–6)	7.
8.	North Carolina	Villanova (2–0)	Auburn (3–0)	Auburn (5–1)	Auburn (6–1)	Auburn (8–1)	Gonzaga (9–2)	Michigan State (10–2)	Michigan State (11–2)	Texas Tech (13–1)	Texas Tech (15–1)	Kentucky (14–3)	Nevada (19–1)	North Carolina (17–4)	North Carolina (19–4)	North Carolina (20–5)	Houston (26–1)	Texas Tech (24–5)	Tennessee (27–4)	Michigan (28–6)	8.
9.	Villanova	Auburn (2–0)	Michigan (5–0)	Michigan State (5–1)	Kentucky (7–1)	Michigan State (8–2)	North Carolina (8–2)	Florida State (11–1)	Florida State (11–1)	Virginia Tech (13–1)	Virginia Tech (14–1)	Kansas (15–3)	North Carolina (15–4)	Michigan State (18–4)	Houston (23–1)	Houston (25–1)	Michigan (24–4)	Michigan State (23–6)	LSU (26–5)	Texas Tech (26–6)	9.
10.	Michigan State	Kentucky (1–1)	Kentucky (3–1)	Kentucky (5–1)	Michigan State (6–2)	Florida State (8–1)	Michigan State (9–2)	Virginia Tech (10–1)	Virginia Tech (11–1)	Nevada (14–1)	Nevada (16–1)	Virginia Tech (15–2)	Marquette (18–3)	Marquette (19–3)	Marquette (20–4)	Michigan State (21–5)	Marquette (23–4)	LSU (24–5)	Michigan (26–5)	Florida State (27–7)	10.
11.	Auburn	Michigan State (1–1)	Michigan State (3–1)	North Carolina (6–1)	Florida State (6–2)	Texas Tech (8–0)	Florida State (8–1)	Texas Tech (10–1)	Texas Tech (11–1)	Auburn (11–2)	Florida State (13–3)	North Carolina (14–4)	Kansas (16–4)	Virginia Tech (18–3)	Michigan State (19–5)	Marquette (21–4)	Texas Tech (22–5)	Purdue (22–7)	Houston (29–2)	Houston (31–3)	11.
12.	Kansas State	Kansas State (2–0)	Kansas State (4–0)	Kansas State (6–0)	Wisconsin (7–1)	North Carolina (7–2)	Texas Tech (10–0)	Auburn (10–2)	Auburn (11–2)	North Carolina (11–3)	Kentucky (12–3)	Marquette (16–3)	Virginia Tech (16–3)	Houston (21–1)	Purdue (17–6)	Kansas (20–6)	Nevada (25–2)	Houston (27–2)	Florida State (25–6)	LSU (26–6)	12.
13.	West Virginia	Oregon (2–0)	Virginia Tech (4–0)	Virginia Tech (5–0)	Texas Tech (7–0)	Virginia Tech (8–1)	Virginia Tech (9–1)	Ohio State (11–1)	Kentucky (10–2)	Florida State (12–2)	North Carolina (12–4)	Maryland (16–3)	Houston (20–1)	Kansas (17–5)	Villanova (19–5)	LSU (21–4)	LSU (22–5)	Kansas (22–7)	Purdue (23–8)	Purdue (23–9)	13.
14.	Oregon	Florida State (2–0)	Florida State (2–0)	Iowa (5–0)	North Carolina (6–2)	Buffalo (9–0)	Buffalo (10–0)	North Carolina (8–3)	Ohio State (12–1)	Mississippi State (12–1)	Auburn (12–3)	Texas Tech (15–3) т	Villanova (16–4)	Villanova (18–4)	Kansas (18–6)	Texas Tech (21–5)	Purdue (20–7)	Florida State (23–6)	Nevada (28–3)	Auburn (26–9)	14.
15.	Virginia Tech	Syracuse (2–0)	Mississippi State (3–0)	Florida State (5–1)	Virginia Tech (6–1)	Ohio State (8–1)	Ohio State (9–1)	Wisconsin (10–2)	North Carolina (9–3)	NC State (13–1)	Marquette (14–3)	Buffalo (17–1) т	Louisville (15–5)	Purdue (16–6)	Texas Tech (19–5)	Purdue (18–7)	Kansas (20–7)	Virginia Tech (22–6)	Kansas State (24–7)	Buffalo (31–3)	15.
16.	Syracuse	Virginia Tech (1–0)	Clemson (3–0)	Ohio State (6–0)	Kansas State (6–1)	Wisconsin (8–2)	Wisconsin (9–2)	Kentucky (9–2)	Marquette (11–2)	Ohio State (12–2)	Buffalo (15–1)	Auburn (13–4)	Texas Tech (16–4)	Louisville (16–6)	Louisville (17–7)	Florida State (20–5)	Kansas State (21–6)	Marquette (23–6)	Virginia Tech (23–7)	Virginia Tech (24–8)	16.
17.	Florida State	Mississippi State (2–0)	UCLA (3–0)	Texas (5–1)	Buffalo (7–0)	Villanova (8–2)	Mississippi State (9–1)	Arizona State (9–2)	Mississippi State (12–1)	Houston (15–0)	NC State (14–2)	Houston (18–1)	Purdue (14–6)	Iowa State (17–5)	Florida State (18–5)	Villanova (20–6)	Maryland (21–7)	Nevada (26–3)	Kansas (23–8)	Kansas (25–9)	17.
18.	Mississippi State	Michigan (2–0)	TCU (3–0)	Oregon (4–1)	Iowa (6–1)	Mississippi State (8–1)	Arizona State (8–1)	Marquette (10–2)	NC State (12–1)	Kentucky (10–3)	Ole Miss (13–2)	Villanova (14–4)	Buffalo (18–2)	Texas Tech (17–5)	Kansas State (18–5)	Louisville (18–8)	Florida State (21–6)	Kansas State (22–7)	Buffalo (28–3)	Kansas State (25–8)	18.
19.	Michigan	Clemson (2–0)	LSU (4–0)	Purdue (5–1)	Ohio State (7–1)	Kentucky (7–2)	Kentucky (8–2)	Mississippi State (11–1)	Houston (13–0)	Buffalo (13–1)	Maryland (14–3)	Iowa (16–3)	LSU (16–3)	Wisconsin (16–6)	LSU (19–4)	Iowa State (19–6)	Wisconsin (19–8)	Buffalo (26–3)	Wisconsin (22–9)	Wofford (29–4)	19.
20.	TCU	UCLA (2–0)	Iowa (4–0)	Texas Tech (6–0)	Arizona State (7–0)	Arizona State (7–1)	Marquette (8–2)	NC State (11–1)	Buffalo (12–1)	Iowa State (12–2)	Oklahoma (13–3)	Ole Miss (14–3)	Iowa State (15–5)	Iowa (17–5)	Wisconsin (17–7)	Virginia Tech (20–5)	Virginia Tech (21–6)	Cincinnati (25–4)	Wofford (28–4)	Nevada (29–4)	20.
21.	UCLA	TCU (2–0)	Oregon (3–1)	Buffalo (5–0)	Villanova (6–2)	Marquette (8–2)	Houston (10–0)	Buffalo (11–1)	Indiana (11–2)	Marquette (12–3)	Houston (16–1)	NC State (15–3)	Maryland (16–5)	LSU (17–4)	Iowa (19–5)	Iowa (20–5)	Buffalo (24–3)	Wisconsin (20–9)	Maryland (22–9)	Wisconsin (23–10)	21.
22.	Clemson	LSU (2–0)	Buffalo (3–0)	Wisconsin (5–1)	Mississippi State (6–1)	Iowa (7–2)	Indiana (9–2)	Houston (12–0)	Wisconsin (10–3)	Indiana (12–3)	Villanova (13–4)	Mississippi State (14–3)	Mississippi State (15–4)	Florida State (16–5)	Virginia Tech (18–5)	Wisconsin (17–8)	Iowa (21–6)	Wofford (26–4)	Auburn (22–9)	Cincinnati (28–6)	22.
23.	LSU	Purdue (2–0)	Ohio State (4–0)	Villanova (5–2)	Maryland (7–1)	Furman (10–0)	Iowa (8–2)	Indiana (11–2)	Oklahoma (11–1)	Oklahoma (12–2)	Iowa (14–3)	Louisville (13–5)	NC State (16–4)	Buffalo (19–3)	Iowa State (18–6)	Kansas State (19–6)	Cincinnati (23–4)	Villanova (22–8)	Marquette (23–8)	Villanova (25–9)	23.
24.	Purdue	Marquette (2–0)	Purdue (4–1)	Maryland (6–0)	Nebraska (7–1)	Houston (8–0)	Furman (12–0)	Iowa (10–2)	Nebraska (11–2)	St. John's (14–1)	Mississippi State (12–3)	Iowa State (14–4)	Wisconsin (14–6)	Maryland (17–6)	Maryland (18–6)	Maryland (19–7)	Wofford (24–4)	Maryland (21–9)	Cincinnati (25–6)	Iowa State (23–11)	24.
25.	Washington	Buffalo (2–0)	Wisconsin (3–0)	Mississippi State (4–1)	Furman (8–0)	Indiana (8–2) т Kansas State (6−2) т Syracuse (7–2) т	Nebraska (9–2)	Oklahoma (11–1)	Iowa (11–2)	TCU (12–1)	Indiana (12–4)	LSU (14–3)	Florida State (15–5)	Cincinnati (19–3)	Buffalo (20–3)	Buffalo (22–3)	Washington (22−5)	UCF (22–6)	Villanova (22–9)	Utah State (28–6)	25.
	Preseason Oct 22	Week 2 Nov 12	Week 3 Nov 19	Week 4 Nov 26	Week 5 Dec 3	Week 6 Dec 10	Week 7 Dec 17	Week 8 Dec. 24	Week 9 Dec. 31	Week 10 Jan. 7	Week 11 Jan. 14	Week 12 Jan. 21	Week 13 Jan. 28	Week 14 Feb. 4	Week 15 Feb. 11	Week 16 Feb. 18	Week 17 Feb. 25	Week 18 Mar. 4	Week 19 Mar. 11	Week 20 Mar. 18	
		Dropped: West Virginia (0–1); Washington (1–1)	Dropped: Villanova (2–2); Syracuse (2–2); Marquette (3–1)	Dropped: Clemson (5–1); UCLA (4–2); TCU (3–1); LSU (5–2)	Dropped: Texas (5–2); Oregon (4–3); Purdue (5–3)	Dropped: Maryland (8–2); Nebraska (8–2)	Dropped: Villanova (8–4); Kansas State (7–2); Syracuse (7–3)	Dropped: Nebraska (10–2); Furman (12–1)	Dropped: Arizona State (9–3)	Dropped: Wisconsin (11–4); Nebraska (11–4); Iowa (12–3)	Dropped: Ohio State (12–4); Iowa State (12–4); St. John's (14–3); TCU (12–3)	Dropped: Florida State (13–5); Oklahoma (13–5); Indiana (12–6)	Dropped: Auburn (13–6); Iowa (16–5); Ole Miss (14–5)	Dropped: Mississippi State (16–5); NC State (16–6)	Dropped: Cincinnati (20–4)	Dropped: None	Dropped: Villanova (20–8); Louisville (18–10); Iowa State (19–8)	Dropped: Iowa (21–8); Washington (23–6)	Dropped: UCF (23–7)	Dropped: Maryland (22–10); Marquette (24–9)	

== USA Today Coaches Poll ==
The Coaches Poll is the second oldest poll still in use after the AP Poll. It is compiled by a rotating group of 31 college Division I head coaches. The Poll operates by Borda count. Each voting member ranks teams from 1 to 25. Each team then receives points for their ranking in reverse order: Number 1 earns 25 points, number 2 earns 24 points, and so forth. The points are then combined and the team with the highest points is then ranked No. 1; second highest is ranked No. 2 and so forth. Only the top 25 teams with points are ranked, with teams receiving first place votes noted the quantity next to their name. The maximum points a single team can earn is 775.

	Preseason Oct 25	Week 2 Nov 19	Week 3 Nov 26	Week 4 Dec 3	Week 5 Dec 10	Week 6 Dec 17	Week 7 Dec 24	Week 8 Dec 31	Week 9 Jan 7	Week 10 Jan 14	Week 11 Jan 21	Week 12 Jan 28	Week 13 Feb 4	Week 14 Feb 11	Week 15 Feb 18	Week 16 Feb 25	Week 17 Mar 4	Week 18 Mar 11	Week 19 Mar 18	Final Apr 9	
1.	Kansas (14)	Duke (3–0) (32)	Gonzaga (6–0) (17)	Gonzaga (8–0) (21)	Kansas (8–0) (26)	Kansas (9–0) (27)	Virginia (11–0) (10)	Duke (11–1) (10)	Virginia (13–0) (11)	Virginia (15–0) (13)	Tennessee (16–1) (30)	Tennessee (18–1) (31)	Tennessee (20–1) (32)	Tennessee (22–1) (30)	Duke (23–2) (28)	Gonzaga (27–2) (26)	Gonzaga (29–2) (27)	Gonzaga (29–2) (28)	Duke (29–5) (25)	Virginia (35–3) (32)	1.
2.	Kentucky (12)	Kansas (3–0)	Kansas (5–0) (15)	Kansas (6–0) (10)	Duke (9–1) (1)	Duke (9–1) (1)	Duke (11–1) (9)	Virginia (11–0) (11)	Duke (12–1) (8)	Duke (14–1) (6)	Duke (15–2) (2)	Duke (17−2) (1)	Duke (19–2) (12)	Duke (21–2) (2)	Gonzaga (25–2) (4)	Duke (24–3)	Virginia (26–2) (5)	Virginia (28–2) (4)	Virginia (29–3) (1)	Texas Tech (31–7)	2.
3.	Duke (4)	Gonzaga (3–0)	Duke (5–1)	Duke (7–1)	Virginia (9–0) (1)	Virginia (9–0)	Tennessee (10–1) (7)	Tennessee (11–1) (7)	Tennessee (12–1) (6)	Tennessee (14–1) (7)	Virginia (16–1)	Virginia (18−1)	Virginia (20–1) (4)	Gonzaga (23–2)	Virginia (22–2)	Virginia (24–2) (2)	North Carolina (24–5)	North Carolina (26–5)	Gonzaga (30–3) (3)	Michigan State (32–7)	3.
4.	Gonzaga (1)	Virginia (3–0)	Virginia (6–0)	Virginia (7–0)	Tennessee (7–1)	Tennessee (8–1)	Michigan (12–0) (4)	Michigan (13–0) (4)	Michigan (15–0) (6)	Michigan (17–0) (6)	Gonzaga (18–2)	Gonzaga (19−2)	Gonzaga (21–2)	Virginia (20–2)	Kentucky (21–4)	Kentucky (23–4) (4)	Duke (25–4)	Kentucky (24–5)	North Carolina (27–6)	Duke (32–6)	4.
5.	Virginia (1)	Tennessee (3–0)	Michigan (6–0)	Michigan (8–0)	Michigan (10–0) (3)	Michigan (11–0)	Kansas (10–1) (2)	Nevada (13–0)	Michigan State (13–2)	Gonzaga (16–2)	Michigan State (16–2)	Michigan (19−1)	Kentucky (18–3)	Kentucky (20–3)	Tennessee (23–2)	North Carolina (22–5)	Tennessee (26–3)	Duke (26–5)	Tennessee (29–5) (1)	Auburn (30–10)	5.
6.	Tennessee	North Carolina (4–0)	Nevada (6–0)	Nevada (8–0)	Gonzaga (9–1) (1)	Nevada (11–0)	Nevada (12–0)	Kansas (11–1)	Gonzaga (14–2)	Michigan State (15–2)	Michigan (17–1)	Kentucky (16−3)	Nevada (21–1)	Nevada (23–1)	Nevada (24–1)	Houston (26–1)	Kentucky (24–5)	Texas Tech (26–5)	Michigan State (28–6)	Gonzaga (33–4)	6.
7.	North Carolina	Nevada (3–0)	Tennessee (4–1)	Tennessee (6–1)	Nevada (10–0)	Auburn (9–1)	Michigan State (10–2)	Michigan State (11–2)	Virginia Tech (13–1)	Virginia Tech (14–1)	Nevada (18–1)	Nevada (19−1)	Michigan (20–2)	Michigan (22–2)	Michigan (23–3)	Tennessee (24–3)	Michigan (26–4)	Michigan State (25–6)	Kentucky (27–6)	Kentucky (30–7)	7.
8.	Villanova	Michigan (3–0)	Michigan State (5–1)	Kentucky (7–1)	Auburn (8–1)	Michigan State (9–2)	Gonzaga (11–2)	Gonzaga (12–2)	Texas Tech (13–1)	Kansas (14–2)	Virginia Tech (15–2)	Michigan State (18−3)	North Carolina (17–4)	North Carolina (19–4)	Houston (25–1)	Michigan State (23–5)	Texas Tech (24–5)	Tennessee (27–4)	Michigan (28–6)	Purdue (26–10)	8.
9.	Nevada	Auburn (3–0)	Kentucky (5–1)	Auburn (6–1)	Michigan State (8–2)	Gonzaga (9–2)	Florida State (11–1)	Florida State (11–1)	Kansas (12–2)	Texas Tech (15–1)	Kentucky (14–3)	Marquette (18−3)	Marquette (19–3)	Houston (23–1)	North Carolina (20–5)	Marquette (23–4)	Purdue (22–7)	LSU (26–5)	Houston (31–3)	North Carolina (29–7)	9.
10.	Michigan State	Kentucky (3–1)	Auburn (5–1) т	Michigan State (6–2)	Florida State (8–1)	North Carolina (8–2)	Virginia Tech (10–1)	Virginia Tech (11–1)	Auburn (11–2)	Nevada (16–1)	Kansas (15–3)	North Carolina (15−4)	Virginia Tech (18–3)	Marquette (20–4)	Marquette (21–4)	Michigan (24–4)	LSU (24–5)	Houston (29–2)	Texas Tech (26–6)	Tennessee (31–6)	10.
11.	Kansas State	Michigan State (3–1)	Kansas State (6–0) т	Florida State (6–1)	Texas Tech (8−0)	Texas Tech (10–0)	Ohio State (11–1)	Texas Tech (11–1)	Nevada (14–1)	Florida State (13–3)	Marquette (16–3)	Virginia Tech (16−3)	Michigan State (18–4)	Purdue (17–6)	Michigan State (21–5)	Texas Tech (22–5)	Michigan State (23–6)	Michigan (26–5)	Florida State (27–7)	Michigan (30–7)	11.
12.	Auburn	Kansas State (4–0)	Virginia Tech (5–0)	North Carolina (6–2)	North Carolina (7–2)	Florida State (8–1)	Auburn (10–2)	Ohio State (12–1)	North Carolina (11–3)	Auburn (12–3)	North Carolina (14–4)	Kansas (16−4)	Houston (21–1)	Michigan State (19–5)	Kansas (20–6)	Purdue (20–7)	Houston (27–2)	Purdue (23–8)	LSU (26–6)	Houston (33–4)	12.
13.	West Virginia	Florida State (2–0)	North Carolina (6–1)	Texas Tech (7–0)	Virginia Tech (8–1)	Virginia Tech (9–1)	Texas Tech (10–1)	Auburn (11–2)	Florida State (12–2)	Marquette (14–3)	Texas Tech (15–3)	Houston (20−1)	Villanova (18–4)	Villanova (19–5)	Purdue (18–7)	Nevada (25–2)	Florida State (23–6)	Florida State (25–6)	Purdue (23–9)	Florida State (29–8)	13.
14.	Syracuse	Virginia Tech (4–0)	Florida State (5–1)	Virginia Tech (6–1)	Ohio State (8–1)	Ohio State (9–1)	North Carolina (8–3)	Kentucky (10–2)	Mississippi State (12–1)	Kentucky (12–3)	Buffalo (17–1)	Villanova (16−4)	Kansas (17–5)	Kansas (18–6)	Texas Tech (21–5)	LSU (22–5)	Kansas (22–7)	Kansas State (24–7)	Kansas State (25–8)	Virginia Tech (26–9)	14.
15.	Florida State	Mississippi State (3–0)	Iowa (5–0)	Kansas State (6–1)	Buffalo (9–0)	Buffalo (10–0)	Kentucky (9–2)	North Carolina (9–3)	Houston (15–0)	North Carolina (12–4)	Auburn (13–4)	Texas Tech (16−4)	Purdue (16–6)	Texas Tech (19–5)	LSU (21–4)	Kansas State (21–6)	Marquette (23–6)	Virginia Tech (23–7)	Virginia Tech (24–8)	LSU (28–7)	15.
16.	Oregon	Clemson (3–0)	Ohio State (6–0)	Wisconsin (7–1)	Villanova (8–2)	Mississippi State (9–1)	Wisconsin (10–2)	Mississippi State (12–1)	NC State (13–1)	NC State (14–2)	Maryland (16–3)	Louisville (15−5)	Iowa State (17–5)	Virginia Tech (18–5)	Villanova (20–6)	Kansas (20–7)	Virginia Tech (22–6)	Buffalo (28–3)	Buffalo (31–3)	Kansas (26–10)	16.
17.	Virginia Tech	UCLA (3–0)	Texas (5–1)	Ohio State (7–1)	Mississippi State (8–1)	Wisconsin (9–2)	Mississippi State (11–1)т	Houston (13–0)	Ohio State (12–2)	Houston (16–1)	Houston (18–1)	Buffalo (18−2)	Louisville (16–6)	Iowa (19–5)	Florida State (20–5)	Florida State (21–6)	Kansas State (22–7)	Nevada (28–3)	Kansas (25–9)	Buffalo (32–4)	17.
18.	Michigan	TCU (3–0)	Purdue (5–1)	Buffalo (7–0)	Kentucky (7–2)	Kentucky (8–2)	Arizona State (9–2)т	Marquette (11–2)	Kentucky (10–3)	Buffalo (15–1)	Villanova (14–4)	Purdue (14−6)	Texas Tech (17–5)	Kansas State (18–5)	Virginia Tech (20–5)	Wisconsin (19–8)	Nevada (26–3)	Kansas (23–8)	Auburn (26–9)	Wofford (30–5)	18.
19.	Mississippi State	Purdue (4–1)	Texas Tech (6–0)	Iowa (6–1)	Wisconsin (8–2)	Arizona State (8–1)	Houston (12–0)	NC State (12–1)	Marquette (12–3)	Oklahoma (13–3)	NC State (15–3)	LSU (16−3)	Wisconsin (16–6)	Florida State (18–5)	Iowa (20–5)	Virginia Tech (21–6)	Cincinnati (25–4)	Wisconsin (22–9)	Wofford (29–4)	Kansas State (25–9)	19.
20.	UCLA	Oregon (3–1)	Buffalo (5–0)	Arizona State (7–0)	Arizona State (7–1)	Houston (10–0)	Marquette (10–2)	Buffalo (12–1) т	Buffalo (13–1)	Ole Miss (13–2)	Ole Miss (14–3)	Iowa State (15−5)	Iowa (17–5)	Louisville (17–7)	Iowa State (19–6)	Maryland (21–7)	Buffalo (26–3)	Wofford (28–4)	Nevada (29–4)	Villanova (26–10)	20.
21.	TCU	LSU (4–0)	Oregon (4–1)	Villanova (6–2)	Iowa (7–2)	Iowa (8–2)	Iowa (10–2)	Iowa (11–2) т	Iowa State (12–3)	Villanova (13–4)	Iowa (16–3)	Mississippi State (15−4)	Mississippi State (16–5)	LSU (19–4)	Kansas State (19–6)	Iowa (21–6)	Wisconsin (20–9)	Maryland (22–9)	Wisconsin (23–10)	Oregon (25–13)	21.
22.	Purdue	Iowa (4–0)	Wisconsin (5–1)	Mississippi State (6–1)	Houston (8–0)	Nebraska (9–2)	Buffalo (11–1)	Indiana (11–2)	Oklahoma (12–2)	Maryland (14–3)	Mississippi State (14–3)	NC State (16−4)	LSU (17–4)	Iowa State (18–6)	Louisville (18–8)	Cincinnati (23–4)	Wofford (26–4)	Marquette (23–8)	Villanova (25–9)	Maryland (23–11)	22.
23.	Clemson	Ohio State (4–0)	Villanova (5–2)	Maryland (7–1)	Maryland (8–2)	Marquette (8–2)	Nebraska (10–2)	Wisconsin (10–3) т	St. John's (14–1)	Mississippi State (12–3)	Florida State (13–5)	Wisconsin (14−6)	Cincinnati (19–3)	Wisconsin (17–7)	Wisconsin (17–8)	Buffalo (24–3)	Villanova (22–8)	Cincinnati (25–6)	Iowa State (23–11)	Nevada (29–5)	23.
24.	Washington	Nebraska (3–0)	Clemson (5–1)	Purdue (5–3)	Kansas State (6–2)	Maryland (9–2)	NC State (11–1)	Nebraska (11–2) т	Indiana (12–3)	Iowa (14–3)	Louisville (13–5)	Maryland (16−5)	Florida State (16–5)	Buffalo (20–3)	Buffalo (22–3)	Louisville (18–10)	Maryland (21–9)	Auburn (22–9)	Cincinnati (28–6)	Wisconsin (23–11)	24.
25.	Nebraska	Buffalo (3–0)	Mississippi State (4–1)	Nebraska (7–1)	Nebraska (8–2)	Furman (12–0)	Indiana (11–2)	Oklahoma (11–1)	Iowa (12–3)	Indiana (12–4)	Iowa State (14–4)	Iowa (16−5)	Buffalo (19–3)	Maryland (18–6)	Cincinnati (21–4) т Maryland (19–7) т	Washington (22–5) т Wofford (24–4) т	Iowa State (20–9)	Villanova (22–9)	Utah State (28–6) т Marquette (24–9) т	Iowa State (23–12)	25.
	Preseason Oct 25	Week 2 Nov 19	Week 3 Nov 26	Week 4 Dec 3	Week 5 Dec 10	Week 6 Dec 17	Week 7 Dec 24	Week 8 Dec 31	Week 9 Jan 7	Week 10 Jan 14	Week 11 Jan 21	Week 12 Jan 28	Week 13 Feb 4	Week 14 Feb 11	Week 15 Feb 18	Week 16 Feb 25	Week 17 Mar 4	Week 18 Mar 11	Week 19 Mar 18	Final Apr 9	
		Dropped: Villanova (2–2); West Virginia (2–2); Syracuse (2–2); Washington (3–1)	Dropped: UCLA (4–2); TCU (3–1); LSU (5–2); Nebraska (5–1)	Dropped: Texas (5–2); Oregon (4–3); Clemson (5–2)	Dropped: Purdue (6–4)	Dropped: Villanova (8–4); Kansas State (7–2)	Dropped: Maryland (9–3); Furman (12–1)	Dropped: Arizona State (9–3)	Dropped: Wisconsin (11–4); Nebraska (11–4)	Dropped: Ohio State (12–4); Iowa State (12–4); St. John's (14–3)	Dropped: Oklahoma (13–5); Indiana (12–6)	Dropped: Auburn(13–6); Ole Miss (14–5); Florida State (15–5)	Dropped: NC State (16–6); Maryland (17–6)	Dropped: Mississippi State (16–7); Cincinnati (20–4)	None	Dropped: Villanova (20–8); Iowa State (19–8)	Dropped: Iowa (21–8); Louisville (19–11); Washington (23–6)	Dropped: Iowa State (20–11)	Dropped: Maryland (22–10)	Dropped: Cincinnati (28–7); Marquette (24–10); Utah State (28–7)	

== See also ==
2018–19 NCAA Division I women's basketball rankings
