= 2016–17 Mercer Bears men's basketball team =

American college basketball season

2016–17 Mercer Bears men's basketball
- Conference: Southern Conference
- Record: 15–17 (9–9 SoCon)
- Head coach: Bob Hoffman (9th season)
- Assistant coaches: Doug Esleeck; Jarred Merrill; Jason Eaker
- Home arena: Hawkins Arena

2016–17 Southern Conference men's basketball standings
	Conf.				Overall
Team	W		L	PCT	W		L	PCT
East Tennessee State †	14	–	4	.778	27	–	8	.771
UNC Greensboro	14	–	4	.778	25	–	10	.714
Furman	14	–	4	.778	23	–	12	.657
Chattanooga	10	–	8	.556	19	–	12	.613
Wofford	10	–	8	.556	16	–	17	.485
Mercer	9	–	9	.500	15	–	17	.469
Samford	8	–	10	.444	20	–	16	.556
The Citadel	4	–	14	.222	12	–	21	.364
Western Carolina	4	–	14	.222	9	–	23	.281
VMI	3	–	15	.167	6	–	24	.200
† 2017 SoCon Tournament winner

The 2016–17 Mercer Bears men's basketball team represented Mercer University during the 2016–17 NCAA Division I men's basketball season. The Bears, led by ninth-year head coach Bob Hoffman, played their home games at Hawkins Arena on the university's Macon, Georgia campus as third-year members of the Southern Conference. They finished the season 15–17, 9–9 in SoCon play to finish in sixth place. They lost in the quarterfinals of the SoCon tournament to East Tennessee State.

== Previous season ==
The Bears finished the 2015–16 season 19–15, 8–10 in SoCon play to finish in seventh place. They defeated The Citadel in the first round of the SoCon tournament to advance to the quarterfinals where they lost to East Tennessee State. They were invited to the CollegeInsider.com Tournament where they lost in the first round to Coastal Carolina.

=== Murder of Jibri Bryan ===
Jibri Bryan, a sixth-year senior, was shot and killed on February 2, 2016. He was found with a gunshot wound to the head in the driver's seat of a Chevy Monte Carlo parked in a convenience store in Macon, Georgia. Bryan played in six games in the 2015–16 season due to a knee injury, averaging 7.8 points per game. Jarvis Clinton Miller has been charged in the murder of Bryan after attempting to flee from the crime scene. In a statement, Mercer coach Bob Hoffman said, "Jibri Bryan was a special young man who was a great contributor to our team and did everything that was asked of him.

== Roster ==
2016–17 Mercer Bears men's basketball team
Players
Coaches

Pos.	#	Name	Height	Weight	Year	Hometown
F	0	Desmond Ringer	6 ft 9 in (2.06 m)	255 lb (116 kg)	RS Jr	McDonough, Georgia
F	1	Cory Kilby	6 ft 7 in (2.01 m)	195 lb (88 kg)	So	Ada, Oklahoma
G	2	Jaylen Stowe	6 ft 2 in (1.88 m)	200 lb (91 kg)	RS So	Harrisburg, North Carolina
G	3	Stephen Gavin	6 ft 3 in (1.91 m)	190 lb (86 kg)	So	Savannah, Georgia
G	5	Jordan Strawberry	6 ft 1 in (1.85 m)	175 lb (79 kg)	Jr	Anaheim, California
G	10	Ria'n Holland	6 ft 0 in (1.83 m)	152 lb (69 kg)	Jr	Fayetteville, North Carolina
G	13	Ryan Johnson	6 ft 5 in (1.96 m)	192 lb (87 kg)	RS So	Greensboro, North Carolina
G	14	Ethan Stair	6 ft 5 in (1.96 m)	205 lb (93 kg)	So	Hazel Green, Alabama
F	15	Stephon Jelks	6 ft 6 in (1.98 m)	225 lb (102 kg)	Jr	Marietta, Georgia
G	20	Darius Roy	6 ft 2 in (1.88 m)	170 lb (77 kg)	Fr	Lawton, Oklahoma
F	23	Demetre Rivers	6 ft 8 in (2.03 m)	180 lb (82 kg)	Jr	Ladson, South Carolina
F	23	Ross Cummings	6 ft 3 in (1.91 m)	165 lb (75 kg)	Fr	Dickson, Tennessee
G	25	Rashad Lewis	5 ft 8 in (1.73 m)	156 lb (71 kg)	Jr	Valdosta, Georgia
C	33	Mac Brydon	6 ft 10 in (2.08 m)	280 lb (127 kg)	Fr	Charlotte, North Carolina
C	44	JJ N'Ganga	6 ft 10 in (2.08 m)	250 lb (113 kg)	RS Sr	Aubervilliers, France
C	55	Andrew Fishler	7 ft 1 in (2.16 m)	218 lb (99 kg)	RS Sr	Cumming, Georgia

Head coach

- Bob Hoffman (Oklahoma Baptist)

Assistant coach(es)

- Doug Esleeck (North Carolina)
- Jarred Merrill (Oklahoma Christian)
- Jason Eaker (Texas–Pan American)

Legend

- (C) Team captain
- (S) Suspended
- (I) Ineligible
- (W) Walk-on
- Injured
- Current redshirt

== Schedule and results ==
Date time, TV	Rank^{#}	Opponent^{#}	Result	Record	Site (attendance) city, state
Non-conference regular season
11/11/2016*; 8:30 pm, ESPN3		Brewton–Parker	W 87–53	1–0	Hawkins Arena (3,553); Macon, GA
11/13/2016*; 8:00 pm, ESPNU		vs. Florida	L 54–76	1–1	Jacksonville Veterans Memorial Arena (3,716); Jacksonville, FL
11/20/2016*; 2:00 pm		Georgia Southern; Savannah Invitational	W 80–67	2–1	Hawkins Arena (3,508); Macon, GA
11/22/2016*; 7:00 pm, ASN		Radford; Savannah Invitational	W 58–47	3–1	Hawkins Arena (2,572); Macon, GA
11/25/2016*; 5:00 pm, ESPN3		vs. East Carolina; Savannah Invitational semifinals	W 70–66	4–1	Savannah Civic Center (2,263); Savannah, GA
11/26/2016*; 7:30 pm		vs. Akron; Savannah Invitational finals	L 63–65	4–2	Savannah Civic Center (2,391); Savannah, GA
11/29/2016*; 7:00 pm		Davidson	L 57–78	4–3	Hawkins Arena (3,228); Macon, GA
12/03/2016*; 4:00 pm		at George Mason	L 68–79	4–4	EagleBank Arena (3,560); Fairfax, VA
12/07/2016*; 7:00 pm, ESPN3		Oglethorpe	W 98–41	5–4	Hawkins Arena (2,625); Macon, GA
12/10/2016*; 4:00 pm, ACCN Extra		at Clemson	L 47–90	5–5	Littlejohn Coliseum (7,514); Clemson, SC
12/18/2016*; 1:00 pm, SECN		at Auburn	L 74–76	5–6	Auburn Arena (7,991); Auburn, AL
12/22/2016*; 7:00 pm, ASN		La Salle	L 96–98 ^{3OT}	5–7	Hawkins Arena (3,272); Macon, GA
12/28/2016*; 7:00 pm, ESPN3		at Kennesaw State	W 80–76	6–7	KSU Convocation Center (1,506); Kennesaw, GA
SoCon regular season
12/31/2016; 1:00 pm, ESPN3		at Wofford	L 71–88	6–8 (0–1)	Benjamin Johnson Arena (1,083); Spartanburg, SC
01/02/2017; 7:00 pm, ESPN3		at Furman	L 69–71	6–9 (0–2)	Timmons Arena (1,378); Greenville, SC
01/05/2017; 7:30 pm, ESPN3		VMI	W 68–50	7–9 (1–2)	Hawkins Arena (2,754); Macon, GA
01/07/2017; 4:30 pm, ESPN3		East Tennessee State	L 58–67	7–10 (1–3)	Hawkins Arena (3,739); Macon, GA
01/11/2017; 8:00 pm, ESPN3		at Samford	W 68–65	8–10 (2–3)	Pete Hanna Center (1,826); Homewood, AL
01/14/2017; 4:30 pm, ASN		Chattanooga	L 68–70	8–11 (2–4)	Hawkins Arena (3,672); Macon, GA
01/19/2017; 7:00 pm, ESPN3		at UNC Greensboro	L 66–68	8–12 (2–5)	Greensboro Coliseum (2,073); Greensboro, NC
01/21/2017; 2:00 pm, ESPN3		at Western Carolina	W 70–50	9–12 (3–5)	Ramsey Center (1,685); Cullowhee, NC
01/28/2017; 4:30 pm, ESPN3		The Citadel	W 82–66	10–12 (4–5)	Hawkins Arena (4,328); Macon, GA
01/30/2017; 7:00 pm, ASN		Western Carolina	W 62–47	11–12 (5–5)	Hawkins Arena (2,789); Macon, GA
02/02/2017; 7:00 pm, ESPN3		Furman	L 68–70	11–13 (5–6)	Hawkins Arena (3,383); Macon, GA
02/04/2017; 4:30 pm, ESPN3		Wofford	L 62–65	11–14 (5–7)	Hawkins Arena (4,386); Macon, GA
02/09/2017; 7:00 pm, ESPN3		at VMI	W 81–51	12–14 (6–7)	Cameron Hall (1,023); Lexington, VA
02/11/2017; 4:00 pm, ESPN3		at East Tennessee State	L 71–88	12–15 (6–8)	Freedom Hall Civic Center (5,225); Johnson City, TN
02/18/2017; 1:00 pm, ESPN3		at The Citadel	W 89–78	13–15 (7–8)	McAlister Field House (3,809); Charleston, SC
02/22/2017; 7:00 pm, ESPN3		UNC Greensboro	L 66–72	13–16 (7–9)	Hawkins Arena (2,877); Macon, GA
02/25/2017; 5:00 pm, ESPN3		at Chattanooga	W 64–54	14–16 (8–9)	McKenzie Arena (5,632); Chattanooga, TN
02/27/2017; 7:00 pm, ESPN3		Samford	W 88–79	15–16 (9–9)	Hawkins Arena (3,021); Macon, GA
SoCon tournament
03/04/2017; 8:30 pm, ESPN3	(6)	vs. (3) East Tennessee State; Quarterfinals	L 66–73	15–17	U.S. Cellular Center (5,127); Asheville, NC
*Non-conference game. ^{#}Rankings from AP Poll. (#) Tournament seedings in parentheses. All times are in Eastern Time.
