= 2016–17 Samford Bulldogs men's basketball team =

American college basketball season

2016–17 Samford Bulldogs men's basketball

CIT, Second Round
- Conference: Southern Conference
- Record: 20–16 (8–10 SoCon)
- Head coach: Scott Padgett (3rd season)
- Assistant coaches: Jake Headrick; Sidney Ball; Charles Newton
- Home arena: Pete Hanna Center

2016–17 Southern Conference men's basketball standings
	Conf.				Overall
Team	W		L	PCT	W		L	PCT
East Tennessee State †	14	–	4	.778	27	–	8	.771
UNC Greensboro	14	–	4	.778	25	–	10	.714
Furman	14	–	4	.778	23	–	12	.657
Chattanooga	10	–	8	.556	19	–	12	.613
Wofford	10	–	8	.556	16	–	17	.485
Mercer	9	–	9	.500	15	–	17	.469
Samford	8	–	10	.444	20	–	16	.556
The Citadel	4	–	14	.222	12	–	21	.364
Western Carolina	4	–	14	.222	9	–	23	.281
VMI	3	–	15	.167	6	–	24	.200
† 2017 SoCon Tournament winner

The 2016–17 Samford Bulldogs men's basketball team represented Samford University during the 2016–17 NCAA Division I men's basketball season. The Bulldogs, led by third-year head coach Scott Padgett, played their home games at the Pete Hanna Center in Homewood, Alabama as members of the Southern Conference. They finished the season 20–16, 8–10 in SoCon play to finish in seventh place. They defeated VMI in the first round of the SoCon tournament before losing in the quarterfinals to Furman. They were invited to the CollegeInsider.com Tournament where they defeated Canisius in the first round before losing in the second round to Liberty.

== Previous season ==
The Bulldogs finished the 2015–16 season 14–19, 4–14 in SoCon play to finish in a tie for eighth place. They defeated VMI in the first round of the SoCon tournament to advance to the Quarterfinals where they lost to Chattanooga.

== Roster ==
2016–17 Samford Bulldogs men's basketball team
Players
Coaches

Pos.	#	Name	Height	Weight	Year	Hometown
PG	00	Christen Cunningham	6 ft 2 in (1.88 m)	190 lb (86 kg)	Jr	Georgetown, Kentucky
PG	2	Justin Coleman (redshirt)	5 ft 10 in (1.78 m)	170 lb (77 kg)	Jr	Birmingham, Alabama
PG	3	Josh Sharkey	5 ft 10 in (1.78 m)	170 lb (77 kg)	Fr	Philadelphia, Pennsylvania
G	4	Triston Chambers	6 ft 2 in (1.88 m)	185 lb (84 kg)	Fr	Cold Springs, Alabama
G	11	James Boone	6 ft 6 in (1.98 m)	185 lb (84 kg)	Fr	Murray, Kentucky
F	13	Eric Adams	6 ft 7 in (2.01 m)	215 lb (98 kg)	Jr	Hoover, Alabama
G	14	Tanner Tapp	6 ft 2 in (1.88 m)	190 lb (86 kg)	So	Brentwood, Tennessee
G	15	Justin Hopkins	6 ft 4 in (1.93 m)	215 lb (98 kg)	Fr	Huntsville, Alabama
F	20	Alex Thompson	6 ft 8 in (2.03 m)	210 lb (95 kg)	RS Jr	Dothan, Alabama
G	22	Demetrius Denzel-Dyson	6 ft 5 in (1.96 m)	205 lb (93 kg)	RS Jr	Covington, Tennessee
G	24	Gerald Smith	6 ft 4 in (1.93 m)	185 lb (84 kg)	So	Carbon Hill, Alabama
F	25	Terry Brutus	6 ft 6 in (1.98 m)	250 lb (113 kg)	Sr	Spring Valley, New York
C	33	Wyatt Walker	6 ft 9 in (2.06 m)	240 lb (109 kg)	So	Jacksonville, Florida
F/C	55	Alex Peters	6 ft 8 in (2.03 m)	225 lb (102 kg)	Jr	Mountain Brook, Alabama

Head coach

- Scott Padgett (Kentucky)

Assistant coach(es)

- Jake Headrick (Montevallo)
- Sidney Ball (UAB)
- Charles Newton (Tennessee Tech)

Legend

- (C) Team captain
- (S) Suspended
- (I) Ineligible
- (W) Walk-on
- Injured
- Current redshirt

Roster

== Schedule ==
Date time, TV	Rank^{#}	Opponent^{#}	Result	Record	Site (attendance) city, state
Non-conference regular season
11/14/2016*; 9:00 pm		at San Diego; San Diego Classic	W 83–65	1–0	Jenny Craig Pavilion (2,379); San Diego, CA
11/16/2016*; 8:00 pm		at New Mexico State; San Diego Classic	L 48–58	1–1	Pan American Center (3,373); Las Cruces, NM
11/21/2016*; 6:00 pm		at Campbell	W 66–53	2–1	Gore Arena (1,863); Buies Creek, NC
11/23/2016*; 6:00 pm, ESPN3		at Cincinnati	L 55–70	2–2	Fifth Third Arena (7,422); Cincinnati, OH
11/26/2016*; 7:00 pm		Behtune-Cookman; San Diego Classic	W 93–65	3–2	Pete Hanna Center (686); Homewood, AL
11/27/2016*; 7:00 pm		Nicholls State; San Diego Classic	L 103–106 ^{2OT}	3–3	Pete Hanna Center (802); Homewood, AL
11/29/2016*; 7:00 pm		at Saint Louis	W 68–64	4–3	Chaifetz Arena (4,916); St. Louis, MO
12/04/2016*; 3:00 pm, ESPN3		Jacksonville State	W 81–77	5–3	Pete Hanna Center (1,563); Homewood, AL
12/10/2016*; 6:00 pm, ESPN3		Miles	W 92–73	6–3	Pete Hanna Center (1,026); Homewood, AL
12/16/2016*; 7:00 pm		at South Alabama	W 82–79	7–3	Mitchell Center (1,925); Mobile, AL
12/19/2016*; 1:00 pm, ACC Extra		at No. 21 Florida State	L 68–76	7–4	Donald L. Tucker Center (4,405); Tallahassee, FL
12/22/2016*; 7:30 pm		Florida A&M	W 83–63	8–4	Pete Hanna Center (1,069); Homewood, AL
12/28/2016*; 7:00 pm		Fort Valley State	W 94–74	9–4	Pete Hanna Center (849); Homewood, AL
SoCon regular season
12/31/2016; 1:00 pm, ESPN3		at UNC Greensboro	W 73–62	10–4 (1–0)	Greensboro Coliseum (1,673); Greensboro, NC
01/02/2017; 6:00 pm, ASN		at Western Carolina	W 70–65	11–4 (2–0)	Ramsey Center (921); Cullowhee, NC
01/05/2017; 7:00 pm, ESPN3		Furman	L 73–83	11–5 (2–1)	Pete Hanna Center (1,011); Homewood, AL
01/08/2017; 3:00 pm, ESPN3		Wofford	W 91–89 ^{OT}	12–5 (3–1)	Pete Hanna Center (1,142); Homewood, AL
01/11/2017; 7:00 pm, ESPN3		Mercer	L 65–68	12–6 (3–2)	Pete Hanna Center (1,826); Homewood, AL
01/14/2017; 12:00 pm, ESPN3		at The Citadel	W 98–90	13–6 (4–2)	McAlister Field House (1,175); Charleston, SC
01/21/2017; 4:00 pm		at Chattanooga	L 78–82	13–7 (4–3)	McKenzie Arena (4,644); Chattanooga, TN
01/25/2017; 7:00 pm, ESPN3		East Tennessee State	L 86–96 ^{2OT}	13–8 (4–4)	Pete Hanna Center (2,012); Homewood, AL
01/28/2017; 12:00 pm, ESPN3		at VMI	W 69–67	14–8 (5–4)	Cameron Hall (2,387); Lexington, VA
02/02/2017; 7:00 pm, ESPN3		Western Carolina	W 82–63	15–8 (6–4)	Pete Hanna Center (1,190); Homewood, AL
02/04/2017; 3:00 pm, ASN		UNC Greensboro	L 75–81	15–9 (6–5)	Pete Hanna Center (1,408); Homewood, AL
02/09/2017; 6:00 pm		at Wofford	L 127–131 ^{4OT}	15–10 (6–6)	Benjamin Johnson Arena (1,583); Spartanburg, SC
02/11/2017; 7:00 pm, ESPN3		at Furman	L 73–90	15–11 (6–7)	Timmons Arena (2,358); Greenville, SC
02/15/2017; 6:00 pm, ESPN3		at East Tennessee State	L 77–79	15–12 (6–8)	Freedom Hall Civic Center (3,623); Johnson City, TN
02/18/2017; 6:00 pm, ESPN3		VMI	W 80–61	16–12 (7–8)	Pete Hanna Center (2,358); Homewood, AL
02/22/2017; 7:00 pm, ESPN3		Chattanooga	W 72–68 ^{OT}	17–12 (8–8)	Pete Hanna Center (1,874); Homewood, AL
02/25/2017; 6:00 pm, ESPN3		The Citadel	L 96–102	17–13 (8–9)	Pete Hanna Center (2,101); Homewood, AL
02/27/2017; 6:00 pm, ESPN3		at Mercer	L 79–88	17–14 (8–10)	Hawkins Arena (3,021); Macon, GA
SoCon tournament
03/03/2017; 6:30 pm, ESPN3	(7)	vs. (10) VMI; First round	W 79–61	18–14	U.S. Cellular Center (2,930); Asheville, NC
03/04/2017; 6:00 pm, ESPN3	(7)	vs. (2) Furman; Quarterfinals	W 67–63	19–14	U.S. Cellular Center (5,127); Asheville, NC
03/05/2017; 6:00 pm, ESPN3	(7)	vs. (3) East Tennessee State; Semifinals	L 72–81	19–15	U.S. Cellular Center (5,079); Asheville, NC
CIT
03/14/2017*; 6:30 pm, Facebook Live		Canisius; First Round	W 78–74	20–15	Pete Hanna Center (614); Homewood, AL
03/20/2017*; 6:00 pm, Facebook Live		at Liberty; Second Round	L 58–66	20–16	Vines Center (1,388); Lynchburg, VA
*Non-conference game. ^{#}Rankings from AP Poll. (#) Tournament seedings in parentheses. All times are in Central Time.
