= 2016–17 UNC Greensboro Spartans men's basketball team =

American college basketball season

2016–17 UNC Greensboro Spartans men's basketball

SoCon regular season co-champions

NIT, First round
- Conference: Southern Conference
- Record: 25–10 (14–4 SoCon)
- Head coach: Wes Miller (6th season)
- Assistant coaches: Mike Roberts; Andre Morgan; Chris Parsons
- Home arena: Greensboro Coliseum Complex; Fleming Gymnasium

2016–17 Southern Conference men's basketball standings
	Conf.				Overall
Team	W		L	PCT	W		L	PCT
East Tennessee State †	14	–	4	.778	27	–	8	.771
UNC Greensboro	14	–	4	.778	25	–	10	.714
Furman	14	–	4	.778	23	–	12	.657
Chattanooga	10	–	8	.556	19	–	12	.613
Wofford	10	–	8	.556	16	–	17	.485
Mercer	9	–	9	.500	15	–	17	.469
Samford	8	–	10	.444	20	–	16	.556
The Citadel	4	–	14	.222	12	–	21	.364
Western Carolina	4	–	14	.222	9	–	23	.281
VMI	3	–	15	.167	6	–	24	.200
† 2017 SoCon Tournament winner

The 2016–17 UNC Greensboro Spartans men's basketball team represented the University of North Carolina at Greensboro during the 2016–17 NCAA Division I men's basketball season. The Spartans, led by sixth-year head coach Wes Miller, played their home games at the Greensboro Coliseum, with two home games at Fleming Gymnasium, as members of the Southern Conference. They finished the season 25–10, 14–4 in SoCon play to finish in a three-way tie for the SoCon regular season championship. As the No. 1 seed in the SoCon tournament, they defeated The Citadel and Wofford to advance to the championship game where they lost to East Tennessee State. As a conference champion and No. 1 seed in their conference tournament who failed to win their conference tournament, they received an automatic bid to the National Invitation Tournament where they lost in the first round to Syracuse.

== Previous season ==
The Spartans finished the 2015–16 season 15–19, 10–8 in SoCon play to finish in a tie for fifth place. They lost in the quarterfinals of the SoCon tournament to Furman. They were invited to the College Basketball Invitational where they defeated Houston Baptist in the first round before losing in the quarterfinals to Ohio.

== Roster ==
2016–17 UNC Greensboro Spartans men's basketball team
Players
Coaches

Pos.	#	Name	Height	Weight	Year	Hometown
G/F	0	Kylia Sykes	6 ft 5 in (1.96 m)	195 lb (88 kg)	Fr	Washington, D.C.
F	1	Marvin Smith	6 ft 6 in (1.98 m)	205 lb (93 kg)	Jr	Richmond, Virginia
G	2	Malik Massey	6 ft 3 in (1.91 m)	195 lb (88 kg)	Fr	Charlotte, North Carolina
F	3	Jelani Mofford	6 ft 5 in (1.96 m)	187 lb (85 kg)	So	Mississauga, Ontario, Canada
G	4	Taqqi Muhammad	6 ft 4 in (1.93 m)	200 lb (91 kg)	RS Fr	Richmond, Virginia
G	10	Francis Alonso	6 ft 3 in (1.91 m)	185 lb (84 kg)	So	Málaga, Spain
G	11	Demetrius Troy	6 ft 0 in (1.83 m)	187 lb (85 kg)	So	Raleigh, North Carolina
G	13	Justin Jordan	6 ft 3 in (1.91 m)	185 lb (84 kg)	Jr	Davidson, North Carolina
F	14	Kyrin Galloway	6 ft 8 in (2.03 m)	215 lb (98 kg)	Fr	Milton, Georgia
F	15	Garrett Collins	6 ft 5 in (1.96 m)	200 lb (91 kg)	Jr	Asheville, North Carolina
G	20	Diante Baldwin	6 ft 0 in (1.83 m)	191 lb (87 kg)	Sr	Greensboro, North Carolina
F	21	James Dickey	6 ft 9 in (2.06 m)	200 lb (91 kg)	RS Fr	Raleigh, North Carolina
G	22	Jack Konstanzer	5 ft 11 in (1.8 m)	165 lb (75 kg)	Fr	Kill Devil Hills, North Carolina
C	25	Lloyd Burgess	6 ft 11 in (2.11 m)	270 lb (122 kg)	So	Durham, North Carolina
G	30	Clay Byrd	6 ft 0 in (1.83 m)	176 lb (80 kg)	Sr	Connelly Springs, North Carolina
F	32	Jordy Kuiper	6 ft 9 in (2.06 m)	250 lb (113 kg)	Jr	Groningen, Netherlands
C	33	R.J. White	6 ft 8 in (2.03 m)	255 lb (116 kg)	Sr	Frisco, Texas

Head coach

- Wes Miller (North Carolina)

Assistant coach(es)

- Mike Roberts (Indiana)
- Andre Morgan (North Georgia)
- Chris Parsons (Hofstra)

Legend

- (C) Team captain
- (S) Suspended
- (I) Ineligible
- (W) Walk-on
- Injured
- Current redshirt

Roster

== Schedule and results ==
Date time, TV	Rank^{#}	Opponent^{#}	Result	Record	Site (attendance) city, state
Non-conference regular season
11/11/2016*; 7:00 pm, ESPN3		No. 8 Virginia	L 51–76	0–1	Greensboro Coliseum (5,513); Greensboro, NC
11/14/2016*; 7:00 pm, ESPN3		Presbyterian	W 61–42	1–1	Greensboro Coliseum (1,689); Greensboro, NC
11/18/2016*; 7:00 pm		at High Point; HPU Classic	L 57–63	1–2	Millis Center (1,750); High Point, NC
11/19/2016*; 7:00 pm		vs. North Dakota State; HPU Classic	W 65–54	2–2	Millis Center (1,750); High Point, NC
11/20/2016*; 3:30 pm		vs. Navy; HPU Classic	W 72–59	3–2	Millis Center (1,100); High Point, NC
11/25/2016*; 2:00 pm		Belmont Abbey; HPU Classic	W 90–54	4–2	Greensboro Coliseum (1,459); Greensboro, NC
11/29/2016*; 7:00 pm, ESPN3		North Carolina A&T; Battle of Market Street	W 86–66	5–2	Greensboro Coliseum (3,146); Greensboro, NC
12/03/2016*; 7:00 pm, ESPN3		Liberty	W 72–65	6–2	Greensboro Coliseum (1,552); Greensboro, NC
12/05/2016*; 7:00 pm		Mars Hill	W 108–56	7–2	Greensboro Coliseum (1,539); Greensboro, NC
12/09/2016*; 7:00 pm, ESPN3		Wake Forest	L 75–78	7–3	Greensboro Coliseum (3,607); Greensboro, NC
12/14/2016*; 7:00 pm		Southern Wesleyan	W 96–61	8–3	Greensboro Coliseum (1,334); Greensboro, NC
12/19/2016*; 7:00 pm		at UNC Asheville	W 75–73	9–3	Kimmel Arena (1,269); Asheville, NC
12/22/2016*; 6:30 pm, FS1		at Georgetown	L 56–78	9–4	Verizon Center (8,096); Washington, D.C.
SoCon regular season
12/28/2016; 7:00 pm, ESPN3		at The Citadel	W 95–87	10–4 (1–0)	McAlister Field House (1,221); Charleston, SC
12/31/2016; 2:00 pm, ESPN3		Samford	L 62–73	10–5 (1–1)	Greensboro Coliseum (1,673); Greensboro, NC
01/02/2017; 7:00 pm, ESPN3		Chattanooga	W 73–68	11–5 (2–1)	Greensboro Coliseum (1,546); Greensboro, NC
01/07/2017; 5:00 pm, ESPN3		Western Carolina	W 76–57	12–5 (3–1)	Greensboro Coliseum (1,455); Greensboro, NC
01/12/2017; 7:00 pm, ESPN3		at East Tennessee State	W 83–79	13–5 (4–1)	Freedom Hall Civic Center (4,112); Johnson City, TN
01/14/2017; 1:00 pm, ESPN3		at VMI	W 91–82	14–5 (5–1)	Cameron Hall (889); Lexington, VA
01/19/2017; 7:00 pm, ESPN3		Mercer	W 68–66	15–5 (6–1)	Greensboro Coliseum (2,073); Greensboro, NC
01/21/2017; 5:00 pm, ESPN3		The Citadel	W 81–72	16–5 (7–1)	Greensboro Coliseum (2,783); Greensboro, NC
01/25/2017; 7:00 pm, ESPN3		at Wofford	L 74–93	16–6 (7–2)	Benjamin Johnson Arena (1,596); Spartanburg, SC
01/28/2017; 2:00 pm, ESPN3		Furman	L 67–73	16–7 (7–3)	Greensboro Coliseum (3,884); Greensboro, NC
02/02/2017; 7:30 pm, ESPN3		at Chattanooga	L 68–91	16–8 (7–4)	McKenzie Arena (4,364); Chattanooga, TN
02/04/2017; 4:00 pm, ASN		at Samford	W 81–75	17–8 (8–4)	Pete Hanna Center (1,408); Homewood, AL
02/11/2017; 2:00 pm, ESPN3		at Western Carolina	W 76–68	18–8 (9–4)	Ramsey Center (1,971); Cullowhee, NC
02/15/2017; 7:00 pm, ESPN3		Wofford	W 74–55	19–8 (10–4)	Greensboro Coliseum (2,448); Greensboro, NC
02/18/2017; 4:00 pm, ESPN3		at Furman	W 73–52	20–8 (11–4)	Timmons Arena (2,508); Greenville, SC
02/22/2017; 7:00 pm, ESPN3		at Mercer	W 72–66	21–8 (12–4)	Hawkins Arena (2,877); Macon, GA
02/25/2017; 5:00 pm, ESPN3		VMI	W 74–67	22–8 (13–4)	Greensboro Coliseum (2,132); Greensboro, NC
02/27/2017; 7:00 pm, ESPN3		East Tennessee State	W 72–66	23–8 (14–4)	Greensboro Coliseum (3,833); Greensboro, NC
SoCon tournament
03/04/2017; 12:00 pm, ESPN3	(1)	vs. (9) The Citadel; Quarterfinals	W 76–67	24–8	U.S. Cellular Center (4,525); Asheville, NC
03/05/2017; 5:00 pm, ESPN3	(1)	vs. (5) Wofford; Semifinals	W 77–73	25–8	U.S. Cellular Center (5,079); Asheville, NC
03/06/2017; 7:00 pm, ESPN	(1)	vs. (3) East Tennessee State; Championship game	L 74–79	25–9	U.S. Cellular Center (6,400); Asheville, NC
NIT
03/15/2017*; 7:00 pm, ESPN2	(8)	at (1) Syracuse; First round – Syracuse Bracket	L 77–90	25–10	Carrier Dome (4,288); Syracuse, NY
*Non-conference game. ^{#}Rankings from AP Poll. (#) Tournament seedings in parentheses. All times are in Eastern Time.
