= 2016–17 Chattanooga Mocs men's basketball team =

American college basketball season

2016–17 Chattanooga Mocs men's basketball
- Conference: Southern Conference
- Record: 19–12 (10–8 SoCon)
- Head coach: Matt McCall (2nd season)
- Assistant coaches: Kevin Easley; Peter Gash; Eddie Shannon
- Home arena: McKenzie Arena

2016–17 Southern Conference men's basketball standings
| | Conf. | | | | Overall |
| Team | W | | L | PCT | W | | L | PCT |
|---|---|---|---|---|---|---|---|---|
| East Tennessee State † | 14 | – | 4 | .778 | 27 | – | 8 | .771 |
| UNC Greensboro | 14 | – | 4 | .778 | 25 | – | 10 | .714 |
| Furman | 14 | – | 4 | .778 | 23 | – | 12 | .657 |
| Chattanooga | 10 | – | 8 | .556 | 19 | – | 12 | .613 |
| Wofford | 10 | – | 8 | .556 | 16 | – | 17 | .485 |
| Mercer | 9 | – | 9 | .500 | 15 | – | 17 | .469 |
| Samford | 8 | – | 10 | .444 | 20 | – | 16 | .556 |
| The Citadel | 4 | – | 14 | .222 | 12 | – | 21 | .364 |
| Western Carolina | 4 | – | 14 | .222 | 9 | – | 23 | .281 |
| VMI | 3 | – | 15 | .167 | 6 | – | 24 | .200 |
† 2017 SoCon Tournament winner

The 2016–17 Chattanooga Mocs basketball team represented the University of Tennessee at Chattanooga during the 2016–17 NCAA Division I men's basketball season. The Mocs, led by second-year head coach Matt McCall, played their home games at the McKenzie Arena and were members of the Southern Conference. They finished 19–12, 10–8 in SoCon play to finish for fourth place. In the SoCon tournament, they lost to Wofford in the quarterfinals.

On March 29, 2017, head coach Matt McCall left the program to take the head coaching job at UMass. On April 3, the Mocs hired Wisconsin assistant Lamont Paris as the new head coach.

== Previous season ==
The Mocs finished the 2015–16 season 29–6, 15–3 in SoCon play to win the SoCon regular season championship. They defeated Samford, Western Carolina, and East Tennessee State to win the SoCon tournament. As a result, they received the conference's automatic bid to the NCAA tournament where they lost in the first round to Indiana.

== Roster ==
2016–17 Chattanooga Mocs men's basketball team
Players
Coaches

| Pos. | # | Name | Height | Weight | Year | Hometown |
|---|---|---|---|---|---|---|
| F | 0 | Chuck Ester | 6 ft 7 in (2.01 m) | 220 lb (100 kg) | Sr | Geismar, Louisiana |
| G | 1 | Greg Pryor | 6 ft 2 in (1.88 m) | 192 lb (87 kg) | Sr | Memphis, Tennessee |
| G | 2 | Rodney Chatman | 6 ft 1 in (1.85 m) | 172 lb (78 kg) | Fr | Lithonia, Georgia |
| G/F | 3 | Nat Dixon | 6 ft 4 in (1.93 m) | 183 lb (83 kg) | So | Panama City, Florida |
| G | 4 | Johnathan Burroughs-Cook | 6 ft 2 in (1.88 m) | 188 lb (85 kg) | Sr | Memphis, Tennessee |
| F | 5 | Justin Tuoyo | 6 ft 10 in (2.08 m) | 235 lb (107 kg) | Sr | Fayetteville, Georgia |
| G | 10 | Peyton Woods | 6 ft 3 in (1.91 m) | 180 lb (82 kg) | So | Monticello, Kentucky |
| G | 11 | Makale Foreman | 6 ft 1 in (1.85 m) | 185 lb (84 kg) | Fr | Kingsport, Tennessee |
| G | 12 | Dylan Brewster | 6 ft 0 in (1.83 m) | 180 lb (82 kg) | So | Lenoir City, Tennessee |
| F | 13 | Trayvond Massenburg | 6 ft 7 in (2.01 m) | 220 lb (100 kg) | Jr | Philadelphia, Pennsylvania |
| G | 14 | David Jean-Baptiste | 6 ft 1 in (1.85 m) | 183 lb (83 kg) | Fr | Miami, Florida |
| G | 15 | Andrew Fleming | 6 ft 6 in (1.98 m) | 205 lb (93 kg) | So | Nashville, Tennessee |
| F | 21 | Makinde London | 6 ft 10 in (2.08 m) | 220 lb (100 kg) | RS So | Nashville, Tennessee |
| F | 23 | Tre McLean | 6 ft 5 in (1.96 m) | 195 lb (88 kg) | Sr | Charleston, South Carolina |
| G | 24 | Casey Jones | 6 ft 5 in (1.96 m) | 205 lb (93 kg) | Sr | New Orleans, Louisiana |

Head coach

- Matt McCall (Florida)

Assistant coach(es)

- Kevin Easley (Austin Peay)
- Peter Gash (Lynn)
- Eddie Shannon (Florida)

Legend

- (C) Team captain
- (S) Suspended
- (I) Ineligible
- (W) Walk-on
- Injured
- Current redshirt

Roster

== Schedule and results ==
| Date time, TV | Rank^{#} | Opponent^{#} | Result | Record | Site (attendance) city, state |
Exhibition
| 11/04/2016*; 7:00 pm | | Covenant | W 76–43 | | McKenzie Arena (2,508); Chattanooga, TN |
Non-conference regular season
| 11/11/2016*; 7:00 pm, SECN+ | | at Tennessee; Maui on the Mainland | W 81–69 | 1–0 | Thompson–Boling Arena (14,483); Knoxville, TN |
| 11/13/2016*; 4:00 pm, ESPN2 | | at No. 6 North Carolina; Maui on the Mainland | L 57–97 | 1–1 | Dean Smith Center (13,402); Chapel Hill, NC |
| 11/16/2016*; 7:00 pm | | Hiwassee | W 102–54 | 2–1 | McKenzie Arena (3,150); Chattanooga, TN |
| 11/19/2016*; 8:30 pm | | vs. Central Arkansas; Maui on the Mainland semifinals | W 75–64 | 3–1 | Christl Arena (921); West Point, NY |
| 11/20/2016*; 12:00 pm | | vs. Arkansas State; Maui on the Mainland finals | L 67–73 | 3–2 | Christl Arena (120); West Point, NY |
| 11/26/2016*; 2:30 pm, ESPN3 | | at Kennesaw State | W 88–71 | 4–2 | KSU Convocation Center (1,031); Kennesaw, GA |
| 11/29/2016*; 7:00 pm | | at Coastal Carolina | W 68–52 | 5–2 | HTC Center (1,339); Conway, SC |
| 12/03/2016*; 2:00 pm | | Louisiana–Monroe | W 79–52 | 6–2 | McKenzie Arena (2,655); Chattanooga, TN |
| 12/06/2016*; 7:00 pm | | Marshall | W 96–85 | 7–2 | McKenzie Arena (3,064); Chattanooga, TN |
| 12/14/2016*; 12:00 pm | | Tennessee Wesleyan | W 107–65 | 8–2 | McKenzie Arena (2,807); Chattanooga, TN |
| 12/17/2016*; 8:30 pm, SECN | | at Vanderbilt | L 74–76 | 8–3 | Memorial Gymnasium (9,376); Nashville, TN |
| 12/21/2016*; 2:00 pm | | Jacksonville State | W 73–57 | 9–3 | McKenzie Arena (3,370); Chattanooga, TN |
SoCon regular season
| 12/31/2016; 2:00 pm | | at Western Carolina | W 64–48 | 10–3 (1–0) | Ramsey Center (1,020); Cullowhee, NC |
| 01/02/2017; 7:00 pm, ESPN3 | | at UNC Greensboro | L 68–73 | 10–4 (1–1) | Greensboro Coliseum (1,546); Greensboro, NC |
| 01/05/2017; 7:00 pm, ESPN3 | | Wofford | W 77–66 | 11–4 (2–1) | McKenzie Arena (2,829); Chattanooga, TN |
| 01/07/2017; 5:00 pm, ESPN3 | | Furman | W 80–64 | 12–4 (3–1) | McKenzie Arena (3,495); Chattanooga, TN |
| 01/11/2017; 7:00 pm, ESPN3 | | The Citadel | W 83–72 | 13–4 (4–1) | McKenzie Arena (3,143); Chattanooga, TN |
| 01/14/2017; 4:30 pm | | at Mercer | W 70–68 | 14–4 (5–1) | Hawkins Arena (3,672); Macon, GA |
| 01/21/2017; 5:00 pm, ESPN3 | | Samford | W 82–78 | 15–4 (6–1) | McKenzie Arena (4,644); Chattanooga, TN |
| 01/25/2017; 7:00 pm, ESPN3 | | VMI | L 64–80 | 15–5 (6–2) | McKenzie Arena (2,847); Chattanooga, TN |
| 01/28/2017; 4:00 pm | | at East Tennessee State | L 71–76 | 15–6 (6–3) | Freedom Hall Civic Center (6,149); Johnson City, TN |
| 02/02/2017; 7:30 pm, ESPN3 | | UNC Greensboro | W 91–68 | 16–6 (7–3) | McKenzie Arena (4,364); Chattanooga, TN |
| 02/04/2017; 5:00 pm, ESPN3 | | Western Carolina | W 77–65 | 17–6 (8–3) | McKenzie Arena (5,449); Chattanooga, TN |
| 02/09/2017; 7:00 pm | | at Furman | L 56–60 | 17–7 (8–4) | Timmons Arena (2,223); Greenville, SC |
| 02/11/2017; 7:00 pm | | at Wofford | W 73–65 | 18–7 (9–4) | Benjamin Johnson Arena (3,004); Spartanburg, SC |
| 02/15/2017; 7:00 pm | | at VMI | W 74–68 | 19–7 (10–4) | Cameron Hall (969); Lexington, VA |
| 02/18/2017; 5:00 pm, ESPN3 | | East Tennessee State | L 51–65 | 19–8 (10–5) | McKenzie Arena (6,402); Chattanooga, TN |
| 02/22/2017; 8:00 pm, ESPN3 | | at Samford | L 68–72 ^{OT} | 19–9 (10–6) | Pete Hanna Center (1,874); Homewood, AL |
| 02/25/2017; 5:00 pm, ESPN3 | | Mercer | L 54–64 | 19–10 (10–7) | McKenzie Arena (5,632); Chattanooga, TN |
| 02/27/2017; 7:00 pm, ASN | | at The Citadel | L 76–85 | 19–11 (10–8) | McAlister Field House (3,300); Charleston, SC |
SoCon tournament
| 03/04/2017; 2:30 pm, ESPN3 | (4) | vs. (5) Wofford; Quarterfinals | L 67–79 | 19–12 | U.S. Cellular Center (4,525); Asheville, NC |
*Non-conference game. ^{#}Rankings from AP Poll. (#) Tournament seedings in parentheses. All times are in Eastern Time Source.

== See also ==
- 2016-17 Chattanooga Mocs women's basketball
