= 2016–17 Furman Paladins men's basketball team =

American college basketball season

2016–17 Furman Paladins men's basketball

SoCon regular season co-champions

CIT, Semifinals
- Conference: Southern Conference
- Record: 23–12 (14–4 SoCon)
- Head coach: Niko Medved (4th season)
- Assistant coaches: Bob Richey; Jay McAuley; Dwight Perry
- Home arena: Timmons Arena

2016–17 Southern Conference men's basketball standings
	Conf.				Overall
Team	W		L	PCT	W		L	PCT
East Tennessee State †	14	–	4	.778	27	–	8	.771
UNC Greensboro	14	–	4	.778	25	–	10	.714
Furman	14	–	4	.778	23	–	12	.657
Chattanooga	10	–	8	.556	19	–	12	.613
Wofford	10	–	8	.556	16	–	17	.485
Mercer	9	–	9	.500	15	–	17	.469
Samford	8	–	10	.444	20	–	16	.556
The Citadel	4	–	14	.222	12	–	21	.364
Western Carolina	4	–	14	.222	9	–	23	.281
VMI	3	–	15	.167	6	–	24	.200
† 2017 SoCon Tournament winner

The 2016–17 Furman Paladins men's basketball team represented Furman University during the 2016–17 NCAA Division I men's basketball season. The Paladins, led by fourth-year head coach Niko Medved, played their home games at Timmons Arena in Greenville, South Carolina as members of the Southern Conference. They finished the season 23–12, 14–4 in SoCon play to finish in a three-way tie for the SoCon regular season championship. They lost to Samford in the quarterfinals SoCon tournament. They were invited to the CollegeInsider.com Tournament where they defeated USC Upstate and Campbell before losing in the semifinals to Saint Peter's.

On March 26, 2017, head coach Niko Medved resigned to become the head coach at Drake. He finished at Furman with a four-year record of 62–70. Assistant coach Bob Richey was named the interim head coach for the CIT Semifinal, and was named full time head coach on April 10.

== Previous season ==
The Paladins finished the 2015–16 season 19–16, 11–7 in SoCon play to finish in a tie for third place. They defeated UNC Greensboro to advance to the semifinals of the SoCon tournament where they lost to East Tennessee State. They were invited to the CollegeInsider.com Tournament where they defeated Louisiana–Monroe in the first round before losing to Louisiana–Lafayette.

== Roster ==
2016–17 Furman Paladins men's basketball team
Players
Coaches

Pos.	#	Name	Height	Weight	Year	Hometown
G	0	Tre Clark	6 ft 5 in (1.96 m)	185 lb (84 kg)	Fr	Palmetto, Florida
G	1	John Davis III	5 ft 11 in (1.8 m)	165 lb (75 kg)	Jr	Beachwood, Ohio
F	2	Jalen Williams	6 ft 8 in (2.03 m)	245 lb (111 kg)	So	Greenville, South Carolina
F	3	Geoff Beans	6 ft 7 in (2.01 m)	210 lb (95 kg)	Jr	Toledo, Ohio
G	4	T. K. Hayes	6 ft 1 in (1.85 m)	175 lb (79 kg)	Sr	Chester, New Jersey
G	5	Andrew Brown	6 ft 4 in (1.93 m)	190 lb (86 kg)	So	Travelers Rest, South Carolina
G	11	Jonathan Jean	5 ft 11 in (1.8 m)	170 lb (77 kg)	So	Tampa, Florida
G	12	Devin Sibley	6 ft 2 in (1.88 m)	175 lb (79 kg)	Jr	Knoxville, Tennessee
G	13	Brady Schuck	6 ft 2 in (1.88 m)	165 lb (75 kg)	So	Charleston, South Carolina
F	21	Kris Acox	6 ft 6 in (1.98 m)	215 lb (98 kg)	Sr	Reykjavík, Iceland
G	23	Jordan Lyons	5 ft 11 in (1.8 m)	170 lb (77 kg)	Fr	Peachtree City, Georgia
F	32	Matt Rafferty	6 ft 8 in (2.03 m)	215 lb (98 kg)	So	Hinsdale, Illinois
G	35	Daniel Fowler	6 ft 4 in (1.93 m)	195 lb (88 kg)	Jr	Acworth, Georgia
F	45	Clay Mounce	6 ft 7 in (2.01 m)	200 lb (91 kg)	Fr	Mount Airy, North Carolina

Head coach

- Niko Medved (Minnesota)

Assistant coach(es)

- Bob Richey (North Greenville)
- Jay McAuley (Georgia)
- Dwight Perry (Kentucky)

Legend

- (C) Team captain
- (S) Suspended
- (I) Ineligible
- (W) Walk-on
- Injured
- Current redshirt

Roster

== Schedule and results ==
Date time, TV	Rank^{#}	Opponent^{#}	Result	Record	Site (attendance) city, state
Exhibition
11/02/2016*; 7:00 pm		Bob Jones	W 101–72		Bon Secours Wellness Arena (1,143); Greenville, SC
Non-conference regular season
11/11/2016*; 7:00 pm		at Presbyterian	L 71–73	0–1	Templeton Physical Education Center (912); Clinton, SC
11/14/2016*; 8:00 pm		at UAB; CBE Hall of Fame Classic	W 84–74	1–1	Bartow Arena (3,682); Birmingham, AL
11/17/2016*; 7:00 pm, SECN		at Georgia; CBE Hall of Fame Classic	L 78–84	1–2	Stegeman Coliseum (5,923); Athens, GA
11/19/2016*; 4:00 pm, ESPN3		Trinity Baptist	W 102–53	2–2	Timmons Arena (1,209); Greenville, SC
11/22/2016*; 7:00 pm, ESPN3		UNC Asheville; CBE Hall of Fame Classic	L 58–64	2–3	Timmons Arena (1,216); Greenville, SC
11/25/2016*; 7:00 pm, ESPN3		Hiwassee	W 98–48	3–3	Timmons Arena (571); Greenville, SC
11/30/2016*; 6:30 pm		at Winthrop	L 57–58 ^{OT}	3–4	Winthrop Coliseum (1,441); Rock Hill, SC
12/03/2016*; 4:00 pm, ESPN3		Navy	W 79–46	4–4	Timmons Arena (1,506); Greenville, SC
12/06/2016*; 7:00 pm, ESPN3		at Liberty	W 61–58	5–4	Vines Center (1,541); Lynchburg, VA
12/10/2016*; 3:00 pm		at Gardner–Webb	W 68–65	6–4	Paul Porter Arena (1,539); Boiling Springs, NC
12/16/2016*; 7:00 pm, ESPN3		South Carolina State	L 67–69	6–5	Timmons Arena (1,008); Greenville, SC
12/19/2016*; 7:00 pm		at Tennessee Tech	W 68–62	7–5	Eblen Center (799); Cookeville, TN
12/22/2016*; 7:00 pm, BTN		at Michigan	L 62–68	7–6	Crisler Center (10,634); Ann Arbor, MI
SoCon regular season
12/31/2016; 12:00 pm, ESPN3		The Citadel	W 83–68	8–6 (1–0)	Timmons Arena (1,529); Greenville, SC
01/02/2017; 7:00 pm, ESPN3		Mercer	W 71–69	9–6 (2–0)	Timmons Arena (1,378); Greenville, SC
01/05/2017; 8:00 pm, ESPN3		at Samford	W 83–73	10–6 (3–0)	Pete Hanna Center (1,011); Homewood, AL
01/07/2017; 5:00 pm, ESPN3		at Chattanooga	L 64–80	10–7 (3–1)	McKenzie Arena (3,495); Chattanooga, TN
01/14/2017; 7:00 pm		at Wofford	L 58–67	10–8 (3–2)	Benjamin Johnson Arena (2,675); Spartanburg, SC
01/19/2017; 7:00 pm, ESPN3		East Tennessee State	W 75–62	11–8 (4–2)	Timmons Arena (1,609); Greenville, SC
01/21/2017; 7:00 pm, ESPN3		VMI	W 89–72	12–8 (5–2)	Timmons Arena (1,734); Greenville, SC
01/25/2017; 7:00 pm, ESPN3		Western Carolina	W 85–37	13–8 (6–2)	Timmons Arena (1,431); Greenville, SC
01/28/2017; 2:00 pm		at UNC Greensboro	W 73–67	14–8 (7–2)	Greensboro Coliseum (3,884); Greensboro, NC
02/02/2017; 7:00 pm, ESPN3		at Mercer	W 70–68	15–8 (8–2)	Hawkins Arena (3,383); Macon, GA
02/04/2017; 1:00 pm, ESPN3		at The Citadel	W 99–91	16–8 (9–2)	McAlister Field House (4,388); Charleston, SC
02/09/2017; 7:00 pm, ESPN3		Chattanooga	W 60–56	17–8 (10–2)	Timmons Arena (2,223); Greenville, SC
02/11/2017; 4:00 pm, ESPN3		Samford	W 90–73	18–8 (11–2)	Timmons Arena (2,358); Greenville, SC
02/13/2017; 7:00 pm, ASN		at VMI	W 80–52	19–8 (12–2)	Cameron Hall (866); Lexington, VA
02/15/2017; 7:00 pm, ESPN3		at Western Carolina	W 74–62	20–8 (13–2)	Ramsey Center (1,329); Cullowhee, NC
02/18/2017; 4:00 pm, ESPN3		UNC Greensboro	W 73–52	20–9 (13–3)	Timmons Arena (2,508); Greenville, SC
02/22/2017; 7:00 pm		at East Tennessee State	L 81–93 ^{OT}	20–10 (13–4)	Freedom Hall Civic Center (6,149); Johnson City, TN
02/25/2017; 2:00 pm, ESPN3		Wofford	W 78–69	21–10 (14–4)	Timmons Arena (2,582); Greenville, SC
SoCon tournament
03/04/2017; 6:00 pm, ESPN3	(2)	vs. (7) Samford; Quarterfinals	L 63–67	21–11	U.S. Cellular Center (5,127); Asheville, NC
CIT
03/16/2017*; 7:00 pm, Facebook Live		at USC Upstate; First Round	W 79–57	22–11	Hodge Center (662); Spartanburg, SC
03/25/2017*; 2:00 pm, Facebook Live		at Campbell; Quarterfinals	W 79–64	23–11	Gore Arena (1,920); Buies Creek, NC
03/29/2017*; 9:00 pm, CBSSN		at Saint Peter's; Semifinals	L 51–77	23–12	Yanitelli Center; Jersey City, NJ
*Non-conference game. ^{#}Rankings from AP Poll. (#) Tournament seedings in parentheses. All times are in Eastern Time.
