= 2016–17 East Tennessee State Buccaneers men's basketball team =

American college basketball season

2016–17 East Tennessee State Buccaneers men's basketball
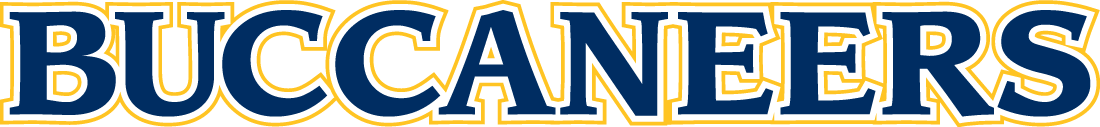

SoCon regular season co-champions and tournament champions

NCAA tournament, First Round
- Conference: Southern Conference
- Record: 27–8 (14–4 SoCon)
- Head coach: Steve Forbes (2nd season)
- Assistant coaches: Jason Shay; Brian Collins; Brooks Savage
- Home arena: Freedom Hall Civic Center

2016–17 Southern Conference men's basketball standings
| | Conf. | | | | Overall |
| Team | W | | L | PCT | W | | L | PCT |
|---|---|---|---|---|---|---|---|---|
| East Tennessee State † | 14 | – | 4 | .778 | 27 | – | 8 | .771 |
| UNC Greensboro | 14 | – | 4 | .778 | 25 | – | 10 | .714 |
| Furman | 14 | – | 4 | .778 | 23 | – | 12 | .657 |
| Chattanooga | 10 | – | 8 | .556 | 19 | – | 12 | .613 |
| Wofford | 10 | – | 8 | .556 | 16 | – | 17 | .485 |
| Mercer | 9 | – | 9 | .500 | 15 | – | 17 | .469 |
| Samford | 8 | – | 10 | .444 | 20 | – | 16 | .556 |
| The Citadel | 4 | – | 14 | .222 | 12 | – | 21 | .364 |
| Western Carolina | 4 | – | 14 | .222 | 9 | – | 23 | .281 |
| VMI | 3 | – | 15 | .167 | 6 | – | 24 | .200 |
† 2017 SoCon Tournament winner

The 2016–17 East Tennessee State Buccaneers basketball team represented East Tennessee State University during the 2016–17 NCAA Division I men's basketball season. The Buccaneers, led by second-year head coach Steve Forbes, played their home games at the Freedom Hall Civic Center in Johnson City, Tennessee as of the Southern Conference. They finished the season 27–8, 14–4 in SoCon play to finish in a three-way tie for the SoCon regular season championship. They defeated Mercer, Samford and UNC Greensboro to win the SoCon tournament. As a result, they received the conference's automatic bid to the NCAA tournament as the No. 13 seed in the East region. There they lost in the first round to Florida.

== Previous season ==
The Buccaneers finished the 2015–16 season 24–12, 14–4 in SoCon play to finish in to second place. They defeated Mercer and Furman to advance to the championship game of the SoCon tournament where they lost to Chattanooga. They were invited to the inaugural Vegas 16, which only had eight teams, where they defeated Louisiana Tech in the quarterfinals before losing to Oakland in the semifinals.

== Roster ==
2016–17 East Tennessee State Buccaneers men's basketball team
Players
Coaches
}

| Pos. | # | Name | Height | Weight | Year | Hometown |
|---|---|---|---|---|---|---|
| F | 0 | T.J. Cromer | 6 ft 3 in (1.91 m) | 195 lb (88 kg) | Sr | Albany, Georgia |
| G | 1 | Devontavius Payne | 6 ft 2 in (1.88 m) | 175 lb (79 kg) | Jr | Carbondale, Illinois |
| G | 2 | Julian Walters | 5 ft 10 in (1.78 m) | 175 lb (79 kg) | Jr | Madison, Wisconsin |
| F | 3 | David Burrell | 6 ft 6 in (1.98 m) | 200 lb (91 kg) | Jr | Milwaukee, Wisconsin |
| G | 4 | Jason Williams | 5 ft 11 in (1.8 m) | 185 lb (84 kg) | Fr | Detroit, Michigan |
| C | 5 | Peter Jurkin | 7 ft 0 in (2.13 m) | 245 lb (111 kg) | Sr | Juba, South Sudan |
| F | 10 | Isaac Banks | 6 ft 7 in (2.01 m) | 235 lb (107 kg) | Sr | New Orleans, Louisiana |
| G | 11 | Desonta Bradford | 6 ft 4 in (1.93 m) | 190 lb (86 kg) | Jr | Humboldt, Tennessee |
| F | 12 | Hanner Mosquera-Perea | 6 ft 9 in (2.06 m) | 230 lb (104 kg) | Sr | Istmina, Colombia |
| G | 13 | A.J. Merriweather | 6 ft 2 in (1.88 m) | 205 lb (93 kg) | Sr | Jackson, Mississippi |
| G | 14 | Kanayo Obi-Rapu | 6 ft 3 in (1.91 m) | 190 lb (86 kg) | Jr | Greensboro, North Carolina |
| G | 23 | Dillon Reppart | 6 ft 3 in (1.91 m) | 180 lb (82 kg) | Jr | Johnson City, Tennessee |
| G | 24 | Jermaine Long | 6 ft 3 in (1.91 m) | 175 lb (79 kg) | Jr | New Orleans, Louisiana |
| F | 40 | Tevin Glass | 6 ft 8 in (2.03 m) | 220 lb (100 kg) | Sr | Norcross, Georgia |

Head coach

- Steve Forbes

Assistant coach(es)

- Jason Shay
- Brian Collins
- Brooks Savage

Legend

- (C) Team captain
- (S) Suspended
- (I) Ineligible
- (W) Walk-on
- Injured
- Current redshirt

Roster
Last update: November 9, 2016

== Schedule and results ==
| Date time, TV | Rank^{#} | Opponent^{#} | Result | Record | Site (attendance) city, state |
Exhibition
| 11/05/2016*; 4:00 pm | | Mars Hill | W 104–67 | | Freedom Hall Civic Center (2,541); Johnson City, TN |
Non-conference regular season
| 11/11/2016*; 7:00 pm | | Fordham | W 96–59 | 1–0 | Freedom Hall Civic Center (3,309); Johnson City, TN |
| 11/14/2016*; 7:00 pm | | Detroit | W 107–78 | 2–0 | Freedom Hall Civic Center (3,026); Johnson City, TN |
| 11/20/2016*; 3:00 pm | | at UNC Wilmington | L 59–68 | 2–1 | Trask Coliseum (4,032); Wilmington, NC |
| 11/25/2016*; 3:00 pm | | vs. Milwaukee; Sanford Pentagon Showcase | W 86–62 | 3–1 | Sanford Pentagon (626); Sioux Falls, SD |
| 11/26/2016*; 5:30 pm | | vs. South Dakota State; Sanford Pentagon Showcase | W 71–59 | 4–1 | Sanford Pentagon (1,688); Sioux Falls, SD |
| 11/27/2016*; 1:00 pm | | vs. UC Irvine; Sanford Pentagon Showcase | W 72–66 | 5–1 | Sanford Pentagon (291); Sioux Falls, SD |
| 12/01/2016*; 7:00 pm | | Lees–McRae; Sanford Pentagon Showcase | W 85–80 | 6–1 | Freedom Hall Civic Center (2,574); Johnson City, TN |
| 12/04/2016*; 2:00 pm | | Limestone | W 85–57 | 7–1 | Freedom Hall Civic Center (2,435); Johnson City, TN |
| 12/10/2016*; 2:00 pm | | at Dayton | L 61–75 | 7–2 | UD Arena (13,017); Dayton, OH |
| 12/14/2016*; 9:00 pm, SECN | | at Mississippi State | W 67–65 | 8–2 | Humphrey Coliseum (6,479); Starkville, MS |
| 12/17/2016*; 2:00 pm | | at Morehead State | W 78–68 | 9–2 | Ellis Johnson Arena (1,812); Morehead, KY |
| 12/22/2016*; 2:00 pm, ESPN3 | | Tennessee | L 68–72 | 9–3 | Freedom Hall Civic Center (6,149); Johnson City, TN |
| 12/29/2016*; 7:00 pm | | Savannah State | W 92–71 | 10–3 | Freedom Hall Civic Center (2,768); Johnson City, TN |
SoCon regular season
| 12/31/2016; 2:00 pm, ESPN3 | | VMI | W 102–75 | 11–3 (1–0) | Freedom Hall Civic Center (3,051); Johnson City, TN |
| 01/05/2017; 7:00 pm | | at The Citadel | W 115–71 | 12–3 (2–0) | McAlister Field House (1,207); Charleston, SC |
| 01/07/2017; 4:30 pm | | at Mercer | W 67–58 | 13–3 (3–0) | Hawkins Arena (3,739); Macon, GA |
| 01/12/2017; 7:00 pm | | UNC Greensboro | L 79–83 | 13–4 (3–1) | Freedom Hall Civic Center (4,112); Johnson City, TN |
| 01/14/2017; 4:00 pm | | Western Carolina | W 75–52 | 14–4 (4–1) | Freedom Hall Civic Center (4,342); Johnson City, TN |
| 01/19/2017; 7:00 pm | | at Furman | L 62–75 | 14–5 (4–2) | Timmons Arena (1,609); Greenville, SC |
| 01/22/2017; 2:00 pm | | Wofford | W 79–72 | 15–5 (5–2) | Freedom Hall Civic Center (4,034); Johnson City, TN |
| 01/25/2017; 8:00 pm | | at Samford | W 96–86 ^{2OT} | 16–5 (6–2) | Pete Hanna Center (2,012); Homewood, AL |
| 01/28/2017; 4:00 pm | | Chattanooga | W 76–71 | 17–5 (7–2) | Freedom Hall Civic Center (6,149); Johnson City, TN |
| 02/02/2017; 7:00 pm | | at VMI | W 81–71 | 18–5 (8–2) | Cameron Hall (1,094); Lexington, VA |
| 02/06/2017; 7:00 pm | | at Wofford | L 76–79 | 18–6 (8–3) | Benjamin Johnson Arena (1,497); Spartanburg, SC |
| 02/09/2017; 7:00 pm | | The Citadel | W 90–69 | 19–6 (9–3) | Freedom Hall Civic Center (3,845); Johnson City, TN |
| 02/11/2017; 4:00 pm | | Mercer | W 88–71 | 20–6 (10–3) | Freedom Hall Civic Center (5,225); Johnson City, TN |
| 02/15/2017; 7:00 pm | | Samford | W 79–77 | 21–6 (11–3) | Freedom Hall Civic Center (3,623); Johnson City, TN |
| 02/18/2017; 5:00 pm | | at Chattanooga | W 65–51 | 22–6 (12–3) | McKenzie Arena (6,402); Chattanooga, TN |
| 02/22/2017; 7:00 pm | | Furman | W 93–81 ^{OT} | 23–6 (13–3) | Freedom Hall Civic Center (6,149); Johnson City, TN |
| 02/25/2017; 7:00 pm | | at Western Carolina | W 68–52 | 24–6 (14–3) | Ramsey Center (3,015); Cullowhee, NC |
| 02/27/2017; 7:00 pm | | at UNC Greensboro | L 66–72 | 24–7 (14–4) | Greensboro Coliseum (3,833); Greensboro, NC |
SoCon tournament
| 03/04/2017; 8:30 pm, ESPN3 | (3) | vs. (6) Mercer; Quarterfinals | W 73–66 | 25–7 | U.S. Cellular Center (5,127); Asheville, NC |
| 03/05/2017; 7:30 pm, ESPN3 | (3) | vs. (7) Samford; Semifinals | W 81–72 | 26–7 | U.S. Cellular Center (5,079); Asheville, NC |
| 03/06/2017; 7:00 pm, ESPN | (3) | vs. (1) UNC Greensboro; Championship | W 79–74 | 27–7 | U.S. Cellular Center (6,400); Asheville, NC |
NCAA tournament
| 03/16/2017*; 3:00 pm, truTV | (13 E) | vs. (4 E) No. 20 Florida; First Round | L 65–80 | 27–8 | Amway Center (15,037); Orlando, FL |
*Non-conference game. ^{#}Rankings from AP Poll. (#) Tournament seedings in parentheses. E=East Region. All times are in Eastern Time.
