= 2016–17 Western Carolina Catamounts men's basketball team =

American college basketball season

2016–17 Western Carolina Catamounts men's basketball
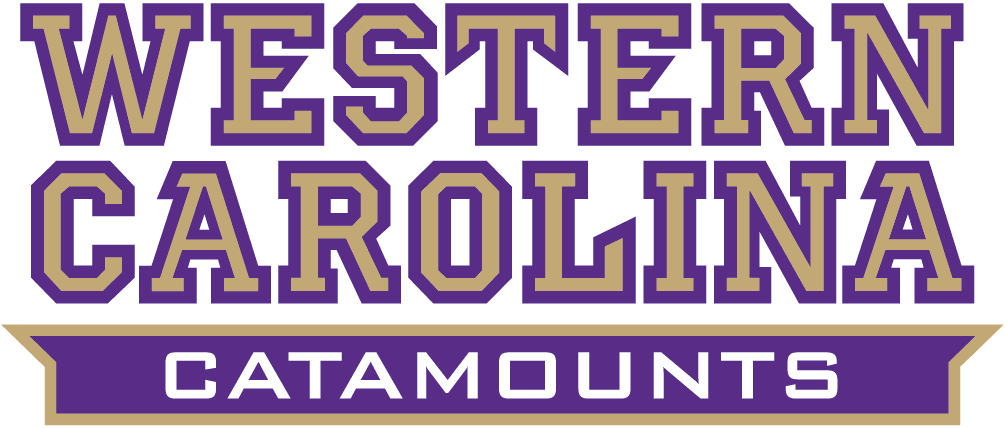
- Conference: Southern Conference
- Record: 9–23 (4–14 SoCon)
- Head coach: Larry Hunter (12th season)
- Assistant coaches: Anquell McCollum; Brigham Waginger; Wilie Freeman
- Home arena: Ramsey Center

2016–17 Southern Conference men's basketball standings
| | Conf. | | | | Overall |
| Team | W | | L | PCT | W | | L | PCT |
|---|---|---|---|---|---|---|---|---|
| East Tennessee State † | 14 | – | 4 | .778 | 27 | – | 8 | .771 |
| UNC Greensboro | 14 | – | 4 | .778 | 25 | – | 10 | .714 |
| Furman | 14 | – | 4 | .778 | 23 | – | 12 | .657 |
| Chattanooga | 10 | – | 8 | .556 | 19 | – | 12 | .613 |
| Wofford | 10 | – | 8 | .556 | 16 | – | 17 | .485 |
| Mercer | 9 | – | 9 | .500 | 15 | – | 17 | .469 |
| Samford | 8 | – | 10 | .444 | 20 | – | 16 | .556 |
| The Citadel | 4 | – | 14 | .222 | 12 | – | 21 | .364 |
| Western Carolina | 4 | – | 14 | .222 | 9 | – | 23 | .281 |
| VMI | 3 | – | 15 | .167 | 6 | – | 24 | .200 |
† 2017 SoCon Tournament winner

The 2016–17 Western Carolina Catamounts men's basketball team represented Western Carolina University during the 2016–17 NCAA Division I men's basketball season. The Catamounts, led by 12th-year head coach Larry Hunter, played their home games at the Ramsey Center in Cullowhee, North Carolina as members of the Southern Conference. They finished the season 9–23, 4–14 in SoCon play to finish in a tie for eighth place. They lost in the first round of the SoCon tournament to The Citadel.

== Previous season ==
The Catamounts finished the 2015–16 season 16–18, 10–8 in SoCon play to finish in a tie for fifth place. They defeated Wofford to advance to the Semifinals of the SoCon tournament where they lost to Chattanooga. They were invited to the College Basketball Invitational where they lost in the first round to Vermont.

== Offseason ==
=== Player departures ===
| Name | Pos. | Height | Year | Hometown | Reason for departure |
|---|---|---|---|---|---|
| Mike Brown | G | 6'3" | Senior | Charlotte, NC | Graduated |
| Rhett Harrelson | G | 5'10" | Senior | Enterprise, AL | Graduated |
| Justin Browning | F | 6'4" | Senior | Sylacauga, AL | Graduated |
| Aaron Williams | G | 6'3" | Sophomore | Morehead City, NC | Left team |

=== Recruiting Class of 2016 ===
College recruiting
| Name | Hometown | School | Height | Weight | Commit date |
|---|---|---|---|---|---|
| Jason McMillan; G | Cherokee, NC | Cherokee High School | 5 ft 11 in (1.80 m) | 160 lb (73 kg) | |
| Jason McMillan; G | Recruit ratings: No ratings found | | | | |
| Onno Steger; F | Upper Arlington, OH | Upper Arlington High School | 6 ft 5 in (1.96 m) | 205 lb (93 kg) | |
| Onno Steger; F | Recruit ratings: No ratings found | | | | |
| Yalim Olcay; F | Izmir, Turkey | SPIRE Academy | 6 ft 8 in (2.03 m) | 225 lb (102 kg) | |
| Yalim Olcay; F | Recruit ratings: No ratings found | | | | |
| Adam Sledd; F | Roanoke, VA | Virginia Episcopal School | 6 ft 8 in (2.03 m) | 220 lb (100 kg) | |
| Adam Sledd; F | Recruit ratings: No ratings found | | | | |
Overall recruit ranking:
Note: In many cases, Scout, Rivals, 247Sports, On3, and ESPN may conflict in their listings of height and weight.; In these cases, the average was taken. ESPN grades are on a 100-point scale.; Sources:

== Roster ==
2016–17 Western Carolina Catamounts men's basketball team
Players
Coaches

| Pos. | # | Name | Height | Weight | Year | Hometown |
|---|---|---|---|---|---|---|
| G | 0 | Maurice Smith | 6 ft 6 in (1.98 m) | 215 lb (98 kg) | Fr | Lauderdale Lakes, Florida |
| G | 1 | Elijah Pughsley | 6 ft 1 in (1.85 m) | 170 lb (77 kg) | So | Lima, Ohio |
| G | 3 | Jason McMillan | 5 ft 11 in (1.8 m) | 165 lb (75 kg) | Fr | Cherokee, North Carolina |
| G | 5 | Devin Peterson | 6 ft 1 in (1.85 m) | 175 lb (79 kg) | Jr | Milton, Georgia |
| G | 11 | Haboubacar Mutombo | 6 ft 5 in (1.96 m) | 190 lb (86 kg) | RS Jr | Pickering, Ontario, Canada |
| F | 12 | Marc Gosselin | 6 ft 7 in (2.01 m) | 205 lb (93 kg) | So | Lyon, France |
| G | 13 | Deriece Parks | 6 ft 5 in (1.96 m) | 155 lb (70 kg) | Sr | Charlotte, North Carolina |
| F | 21 | Kyle Rhoades | 6 ft 6 in (1.98 m) | 190 lb (86 kg) | Sr | Lumberton, North Carolina |
| F | 22 | Jesse Deloach | 6 ft 7 in (2.01 m) | 230 lb (104 kg) | So | Grayson, Georgia |
| F | 24 | Ashley Williams | 6 ft 5 in (1.96 m) | 175 lb (79 kg) | Jr | Morehead City, North Carolina |
| G | 32 | Devonte Fuller | 6 ft 1 in (1.85 m) | 185 lb (84 kg) | RS So | Hickory, North Carolina |
| F | 33 | Onno Steger | 6 ft 5 in (1.96 m) | 205 lb (93 kg) | Fr | Upper Arlington, Ohio |
| F | 35 | Yalim Olcay | 6 ft 8 in (2.03 m) | 225 lb (102 kg) | Fr | İzmir, Turkey |
| F | 41 | Charlendez Brooks | 6 ft 9 in (2.06 m) | 240 lb (109 kg) | RS Jr | Duncan, South Carolina |
| F | 44 | Adam Sledd | 6 ft 8 in (2.03 m) | 220 lb (100 kg) | Fr | Roanoke, Virginia |

Head coach

- Larry Hunter (Ohio)

Assistant coach(es)

- Anquell McCollum (Western Carolina)
- Brigham Waginger (Western Carolina)
- Willie Freeman (Western Carolina)

Legend

- (C) Team captain
- (S) Suspended
- (I) Ineligible
- (W) Walk-on
- Injured
- Current redshirt

Roster

== Schedule and results ==
| Date time, TV | Rank^{#} | Opponent^{#} | Result | Record | Site (attendance) city, state |
Non-conference regular season
| 11/11/2016*; 7:00 pm, ACC Extra | | at Miami (FL) | L 43–92 | 0–1 | Watsco Center (7,142); Coral Gables, FL |
| 11/13/2016*; 2:00 pm | | Hiwassee | W 87–47 | 1–1 | Ramsey Center (1,774); Cullowhee, NC |
| 11/16/2016*; 7:30 pm, ESPN3 | | North Carolina Central; Global Sports Invitational | L 59–67 | 1–2 | Ramsey Center (1,495); Cullowhee, NC |
| 11/19/2016*; 5:00 pm | | at Marshall; Global Sports Invitational | L 63–98 | 1–3 | Cam Henderson Center (5,741); Huntington, WV |
| 11/21/2016*; 7:00 pm, BTN | | at Ohio State; Global Sports Invitational | L 38–66 | 1–4 | Value City Arena (10,452); Columbus, OH |
| 11/26/2016*; 7:00 pm | | at Jackson State; Global Sports Invitational | W 58–47 | 2–4 | Williams Assembly Center (225); Jackson, MS |
| 11/30/2016*; 7:00 pm, FS2 | | at Marquette | L 44–90 | 2–5 | BMO Harris Bradley Center (11,397); Milwaukee, WI |
| 12/03/2016*; 3:30 pm | | at Appalachian State | W 58–53 | 3–5 | Holmes Center (2,497); Boone, NC |
| 12/07/2016*; 7:00 pm, RTPT | | vs. No. 15 West Virginia | L 37–90 | 3–6 | Charleston Civic Center (8,384); Charleston, WV |
| 12/17/2016*; 4:30 pm | | at UNC Asheville | L 57–59 | 3–7 | Kimmel Arena (1,661); Asheville, NC |
| 12/19/2016*; 7:30 pm | | High Point | W 70–65 | 4–7 | Ramsey Center (1,063); Cullowhee, NC |
| 12/22/2016*; 7:00 pm | | College of Charleston | L 59–77 | 4–8 | Ramsey Center (1,103); Cullowhee, NC |
| 12/28/2016*; 2:00 pm | | Mars Hill | W 87–71 | 5–8 | Ramsey Center (944); Cullowhee, NC |
SoCon regular season
| 12/31/2016; 2:00 pm, ESPN3 | | Chattanooga | L 48–64 | 5–9 (0–1) | Ramsey Center (1,020); Cullowhee, NC |
| 01/02/2017; 7:00 pm, ASN | | Samford | L 65–70 | 5–10 (0–2) | Ramsey Center (921); Cullowhee, NC |
| 01/07/2017; 5:00 pm, ESPN3 | | at UNC Greensboro | L 57–76 | 5–11 (0–3) | Greensboro Coliseum (1,455); Greensboro, NC |
| 01/12/2017; 7:00 pm | | at VMI | L 78–79 | 5–12 (0–4) | Cameron Hall (718); Lexington, VA |
| 01/14/2017; 4:00 pm | | at East Tennessee State | L 52–75 | 5–13 (0–5) | Freedom Hall Civic Center (4,342); Johnson City, TN |
| 01/19/2017; 7:00 pm, ESPN3 | | The Citadel | W 100–95 | 6–13 (1–5) | Ramsey Center (1,561); Cullowhee, NC |
| 01/21/2017; 2:00 pm, ESPN3 | | Mercer | L 50–70 | 6–14 (1–6) | Ramsey Center (1,685); Cullowhee, NC |
| 01/25/2017; 7:00 pm | | at Furman | L 37–85 | 6–15 (1–7) | Timmons Arena (1,431); Greenville, SC |
| 01/28/2017; 7:00 pm, ESPN3 | | Wofford | W 68–62 | 7–15 (2–7) | Ramsey Center (1,894); Cullowhee, NC |
| 01/30/2017; 7:00 pm, ASN | | at Mercer | L 47–62 | 7–16 (2–8) | Hawkins Arena (2,789); Macon, GA |
| 02/02/2017; 8:00 pm | | at Samford | L 63–82 | 7–17 (2–9) | Pete Hanna Center (1,190); Homewood, AL |
| 02/04/2017; 5:00 pm | | at Chattanooga | L 65–77 | 7–18 (2–10) | McKenzie Arena (5,449); Chattanooga, TN |
| 02/11/2017; 2:00 pm, ESPN3 | | UNC Greensboro | L 68–76 | 7–19 (2–11) | Ramsey Center (5,225); Cullowhee, NC |
| 02/15/2017; 7:00 pm, ESPN3 | | Furman | L 62–74 | 7–20 (2–11) | Ramsey Center (1,329); Cullowhee, NC |
| 02/18/2017; 7:00 pm, ESPN3 | | at Wofford | L 56–84 | 7–21 (2–12) | Benjamin Johnson Arena (3,317); Spartanburg, SC |
| 02/22/2017; 7:00 pm, ESPN3 | | at The Citadel | W 84–80 | 8–21 (3–12) | McAlister Field House (1,270); Charleston, SC |
| 02/25/2017; 7:00 pm, ESPN3 | | East Tennessee State | L 52–68 | 8–22 (3–13) | Ramsey Center (3,015); Cullowhee, NC |
| 02/27/2017; 7:00 pm, ESPN3 | | VMI | W 81–68 | 9–22 (4–14) | Ramsey Center (981); Cullowhee, NC |
SoCon tournament
| 03/03/2017; 5:00 pm, ESPN3 | (8) | vs. (9) The Citadel; First Round | L 72–78 | 9–23 | U.S. Cellular Center (2,930); Asheville, NC |
*Non-conference game. ^{#}Rankings from AP Poll. (#) Tournament seedings in parentheses. All times are in Eastern Time Source.
