= 2016–17 VMI Keydets basketball team =

American college basketball season

2016–17 VMI Keydets basketball
- Conference: Southern Conference
- Record: 6–24 (3–15 SoCon)
- Head coach: Dan Earl (2nd season)
- Assistant coaches: Steve Lepore (2nd season); Chris Kreider (2nd season); Jason Slay (2nd season)
- Home arena: Cameron Hall

2016–17 Southern Conference men's basketball standings
	Conf.				Overall
Team	W		L	PCT	W		L	PCT
East Tennessee State †	14	–	4	.778	27	–	8	.771
UNC Greensboro	14	–	4	.778	25	–	10	.714
Furman	14	–	4	.778	23	–	12	.657
Chattanooga	10	–	8	.556	19	–	12	.613
Wofford	10	–	8	.556	16	–	17	.485
Mercer	9	–	9	.500	15	–	17	.469
Samford	8	–	10	.444	20	–	16	.556
The Citadel	4	–	14	.222	12	–	21	.364
Western Carolina	4	–	14	.222	9	–	23	.281
VMI	3	–	15	.167	6	–	24	.200
† 2017 SoCon Tournament winner

The 2016–17 VMI Keydets basketball team represented the Virginia Military Institute in the 2016–17 NCAA Division I men's basketball season. The Keydets were led by second-year head coach Dan Earl and played their home games out of Cameron Hall in Lexington, Virginia, their home since 1981. The Keydets played as a member of the Southern Conference. They finished the season 6–24, 3–15 in SoCon play to finish in last place. They lost in the first round of the SoCon tournament to Samford.

== Previous season ==
The Keydets finished the 2015–16 season with an overall record 9–21, and a 4–14 mark in SoCon play to finish in a tie for eighth place. They lost in the first round of the SoCon tournament to Samford.

== Preseason ==
=== Departures ===
VMI lost only three seniors from the previous season.

Name	Position	Class	Reason
Tim Marshall	SG	Sr.	Graduated
Phillip Anglade	F	Sr.	Graduated
Jordan Weethee	F	Sr.	Graduated

=== Recruiting ===
College recruiting information
Name	Hometown	School	Height	Weight	Commit date
Tyler Creammer; C	Parkton, NC	The Miller School	6 ft 10 in (2.08 m)	220 lb (100 kg)	Oct 17, 2015
Tyler Creammer; C	Recruit ratings: ESPN:				
Will Miller; SF	South Boston, VA	Halifax County High School	6 ft 7 in (2.01 m)	210 lb (95 kg)	Nov 11, 2015
Will Miller; SF	Recruit ratings: No ratings found				
Chuchu Enechionyia; SG	Lorton, VA	South County High School	6 ft 7 in (2.01 m)	185 lb (84 kg)	Apr 14, 2016
Chuchu Enechionyia; SG	Recruit ratings: No ratings found				
Garrett Gilkeson; SG	Parkersburg, WV	Parkersburg South High School	6 ft 4 in (1.93 m)	200 lb (91 kg)	Apr 14, 2016
Garrett Gilkeson; SG	Recruit ratings: No ratings found				
Keith Smith; PG	Danville, CA	Montverde Academy	6 ft 0 in (1.83 m)	170 lb (77 kg)	Apr 14, 2016
Keith Smith; PG	Recruit ratings: No ratings found				
Overall recruit ranking:
Note: In many cases, Scout, Rivals, 247Sports, On3, and ESPN may conflict in their listings of height and weight.; In these cases, the average was taken. ESPN grades are on a 100-point scale.; Sources: "ESPN – VMI Basketball Recruiting 2016". ESPN.; "2016 Team Ranking". Rivals.

== Roster ==
2016–17 VMI Keydets men's basketball team
Players
Coaches

Pos.	#	Name	Height	Weight	Year	Previous school	Hometown
G	0	Austin Vereen	6 ft 4 in (1.93 m)	190 lb (86 kg)	So	Maret School	Washington, D.C.
G	1	Keith Smith	6 ft 0 in (1.83 m)	170 lb (77 kg)	Fr	San Ramon Valley	Danville, California
G	2	Garrett Gilkeson	6 ft 4 in (1.93 m)	200 lb (91 kg)	Fr	Parkersburg South	Parkersburg, West Virginia
G	3	Adrian Rich	6 ft 2 in (1.88 m)	170 lb (77 kg)	So	Fishburne Military	Fuquay-Varina, North Carolina
G/F	3	Chuchu Enechionyia	6 ft 7 in (2.01 m)	200 lb (91 kg)	Fr	South County	Springfield, Virginia
C	5	Fred Iruafemi	6 ft 6 in (1.98 m)	200 lb (91 kg)	Jr	Middle Creek	Raleigh, North Carolina
F	12	D'Andre Mahaffey	6 ft 6 in (1.98 m)	195 lb (88 kg)	So	Cedar Shoals	Athens, Georgia
F	14	Will Weethee	6 ft 6 in (1.98 m)	190 lb (86 kg)	So	East Forsyth High School	Greensboro, North Carolina
F	15	Trey Chapman	6 ft 6 in (1.98 m)	205 lb (93 kg)	Sr	Wesleyan Christian	Greensboro, North Carolina
G	20	Marcus Larsson	6 ft 4 in (1.93 m)	195 lb (88 kg)	Fr	Fork Union	Freemont, California
F	21	Armani Branch	6 ft 6 in (1.98 m)	205 lb (93 kg)	Jr	Genesis Academy	Hampton, Virginia
G	22	QJ Peterson	6 ft 0 in (1.83 m)	185 lb (84 kg)	Sr	Hedgesville/Massanutten	Hedgesville, West Virginia
G	24	Will Miller	6 ft 8 in (2.03 m)	210 lb (95 kg)	Fr	Halifax County	South Boston, Virginia
F	25	Tyler Creammer	6 ft 10 in (2.08 m)	245 lb (111 kg)	Fr	Miller School	Parkton, North Carolina
G	35	Julian Eleby	6 ft 3 in (1.91 m)	190 lb (86 kg)	Sr	Village Christian/Fork Union	Fayetteville, North Carolina

Head coach

- Dan Earl (Penn State '97)

Assistant coach(es)

- Steve Lepore (Wake Forest '03)
- Chris Kreider (Lebanon Valley '03)
- Jason Slay (West Va. State '08)

Legend

- (C) Team captain
- (S) Suspended
- (I) Ineligible
- (W) Walk-on
- Injured
- Current redshirt

Roster

=== Depth chart ===
Pos.	Starting 5	Bench 1	Bench 2
F/C	Armani Branch	Fred Iruafemi	Tyler Creammer
SF	Trey Chapman	Will Miller
SG	QJ Peterson	Garrett Gilkeson
SG	Julian Eleby	Austin Vereen
PG	Adrian Rich	Keith Smith

== Schedule and results ==
Date time, TV	Rank^{#}	Opponent^{#}	Result	Record	Site (attendance) city, state
Non-conference regular season
11/11/2016*; 7:00 pm		at Richmond	L 69–72	0–1	Robins Center (7,201); Richmond, VA
11/15/2016*; 7:00 pm		Southern Virginia	W 78–47	1–1	Cameron Hall (896); Lexington, VA
11/19/2016*; 7:00 pm, ACCN Extra		at Virginia Tech	L 72–88	1–2	Cassell Coliseum (7,714); Blacksburg, VA
11/22/2016*; 7:00 pm		at Presbyterian	L 67–77	1–3	Templeton Center (430); Clinton, SC
11/26/2016*; 7:00 pm		Campbell	L 53–67	1–4	Cameron Hall (912); Lexington, VA
11/30/2016*; 7:00 pm		at Radford	L 67–74	1–5	Dedmon Center (1,329); Radford, VA
12/03/2016*; 7:00 pm		Gardner–Webb	L 68–86	1–6	Cameron Hall (1,097); Lexington, VA
12/10/2016*; 2:00 pm, RTPT		at No. 15 West Virginia	L 55–90	1–7	WVU Coliseum (9,023); Morgantown, WV
12/13/2016*; 7:00 pm		Charleston Southern	W 88–83	2–7	Cameron Hall (902); Lexington, VA
12/20/2016*; 7:00 pm		Frostburg State	W 72–53	3–7	Cameron Hall (770); Lexington, VA
12/23/2016*; 7:00 pm, SPCSN		at Dayton	L 56–92	3–8	UD Arena (12,612); Dayton, OH
SoCon regular season
12/31/2016; 4:00 pm		at East Tennessee State	L 75–102	3–9 (0–1)	Freedom Hall Civic Center (3,051); Johnson City, TN
01/05/2017; 7:30 pm		at Mercer	L 50–68	3–10 (0–2)	Hawkins Arena (2,754); Macon, GA
01/07/2017; 1:00 pm		at The Citadel	L 74–79	3–11 (0–3)	McAlister Field House (1,301); Charleston, SC
01/12/2017; 7:00 pm		Western Carolina	W 79–78	4–11 (1–3)	Cameron Hall (718); Lexington, VA
01/14/2017; 1:00 pm		UNC Greensboro	L 82–91	4–12 (1–4)	Cameron Hall (889); Lexington, VA
01/19/2017; 7:00 pm		at Wofford	L 70–88	4–13 (1–5)	Benjamin Johnson Arena (1,458); Spartanburg, SC
01/21/2017; 4:00 pm		at Furman	L 72–89	4–14 (1–6)	Timmons Arena (1,734); Greenville, SC
01/25/2017; 7:00 pm		at Chattanooga	W 80–64	5–14 (2–6)	McKenzie Arena (2,847); Chattanooga, TN
01/28/2017; 1:00 pm		Samford	L 67–69	5–15 (2–7)	Cameron Hall (2,387); Lexington, VA
02/02/2017; 7:00 pm		East Tennessee State	L 71–81	5–16 (2–8)	Cameron Hall (1,094); Lexington, VA
02/09/2017; 7:00 pm		Mercer	L 51–81	5–17 (2–9)	Cameron Hall (1,023); Lexington, VA
02/11/2017; 1:00 pm		The Citadel	W 101–78	6–17 (3–9)	Cameron Hall (3,479); Lexington, VA
02/13/2017; 7:00 pm, ASN		Furman	L 52–80	6–18 (3–10)	Cameron Hall (866); Lexington, VA
02/15/2017; 7:00 pm		Chattanooga	L 68–74	6–19 (3–11)	Cameron Hall (969); Lexington, VA
02/18/2017; 7:00 pm, ESPN3		at Samford	L 61–80	6–20 (3–12)	Pete Hanna Center (2,358); Homewood, AL
02/22/2017; 7:00 pm, ESPN3		Wofford	L 63–81	6–21 (3–13)	Cameron Hall (1,310); Lexington, VA
02/25/2017; 5:00 pm		at UNC Greensboro	L 67–74	6–22 (3–14)	Greensboro Coliseum (2,132); Greensboro, NC
02/27/2017; 7:00 pm		at Western Carolina	L 68–81	6–23 (3–15)	Ramsey Center (981); Cullowhee, NC
SoCon tournament
03/03/2017; 7:30 pm, ESPN3	(10)	vs. (7) Samford; First Round	L 61–79	6–24	U.S. Cellular Center (2,930); Asheville, NC
*Non-conference game. (#) Tournament seedings in parentheses. All times are in Eastern Time; Source.
