= 2016–17 The Citadel Bulldogs basketball team =

American college basketball season

2016–17 The Citadel Bulldogs men's basketball
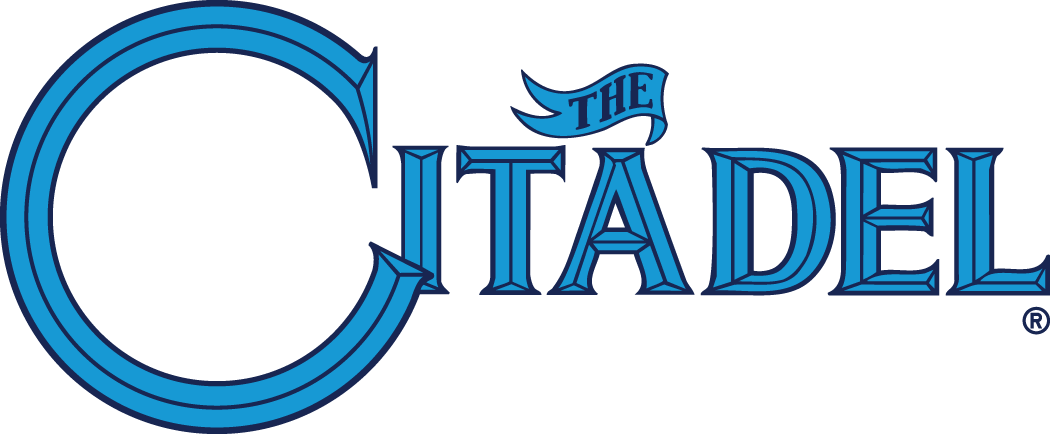
- Conference: Southern Conference
- Record: 12–21 (4–14 SoCon)
- Head coach: Duggar Baucom
- Assistant coaches: Daniel Willis; Ryan Mattocks; Willie Bell
- Home arena: McAlister Field House

2016–17 Southern Conference men's basketball standings
	Conf.				Overall
Team	W		L	PCT	W		L	PCT
East Tennessee State †	14	–	4	.778	27	–	8	.771
UNC Greensboro	14	–	4	.778	25	–	10	.714
Furman	14	–	4	.778	23	–	12	.657
Chattanooga	10	–	8	.556	19	–	12	.613
Wofford	10	–	8	.556	16	–	17	.485
Mercer	9	–	9	.500	15	–	17	.469
Samford	8	–	10	.444	20	–	16	.556
The Citadel	4	–	14	.222	12	–	21	.364
Western Carolina	4	–	14	.222	9	–	23	.281
VMI	3	–	15	.167	6	–	24	.200
† 2017 SoCon Tournament winner

The 2016–17 The Citadel Bulldogs basketball team represented The Citadel, The Military College of South Carolina in the 2016–17 NCAA Division I men's basketball season. The Bulldogs were led by second-year head coach Duggar Baucom and played their home games at McAlister Field House in Charleston, South Carolina. They played as a member of the Southern Conference (SoCon), as they have since 1936–37. They finished the season 12–21, 4–14 in SoCon play, to finish in a tie for eighth place. They defeated Western Carolina in the first round of the SoCon tournament to advance to the quarterfinals where they lost to UNC Greensboro.

== Previous season ==
The Bulldogs finished the 2015–16 season 10–22, 3–15 in SoCon play, to finish in last place. They lost in the first round of the SoCon tournament to Mercer.

== Preseason ==
=== Departures ===
Several players departed the program, two due to graduation, two more as graduate students completing their eligibility, and two to transfer.

Name	Position	Class	Reason
Qwandell Newton	F	FR	Transfer
Connor Schroeder	F	FR	Transfer
P. J. Boutte	G	GR	Exhausted eligibility
Derrick Henry	G	GR	Exhausted eligibility
Bobby Duncan	F	SR	Graduated
Quinton Marshall	G	SR	Graduated

=== Recruiting ===
With many departures, The Citadel added 10 new players for the 2016–17 season. This marks another step in moving from a slow pace to the Baucom-led uptempo style of play. At least one player changed his plans as a result of a photo that surfaced on social media which showed cadets dressed as ghosts, but widely interpreted as similar to Ku Klux Klan garb.

College recruiting information
Name	Hometown	School	Height	Weight	Commit date
Ezekiel Balogun; SF	Chattanooga, TN	Hamilton Heights Christian Academy	6 ft 6 in (1.98 m)	N/A	
Ezekiel Balogun; SF	Recruit ratings: (NR)				
Aaron Washington; SG	Baltimore, MD	DME Academy	6 ft 3 in (1.91 m)	N/A	Jan 24, 2016
Aaron Washington; SG	Recruit ratings: (NR)				
Mohammed Kabir; SF	Fort Washington, MD	National Christian Academy	6 ft 5 in (1.96 m)	N/A	
Mohammed Kabir; SF	Recruit ratings: (NR)				
Frankie Johnson; PG	Darlington, SC	Mayo High School	5 ft 7 in (1.70 m)	N/A	
Frankie Johnson; PG	Recruit ratings: (NR)				
Obinna Ofodile; PF	Duluth, GA	Duluth High School	6 ft 7 in (2.01 m)	205 lb (93 kg)	Feb 20, 2016
Obinna Ofodile; PF	Recruit ratings: (NR)				
Kaelon Harris; SG	Jonesboro, GA	Mundys Mill Farm High School	6 ft 3 in (1.91 m)	220 lb (100 kg)	
Kaelon Harris; SG	Recruit ratings: (NR)				
Chris Ross; SG	Goose Creek, SC	Goose Creek High School	6 ft 3 in (1.91 m)	N/A	
Chris Ross; SG	Recruit ratings: (NR)				
Preston Parks; PG	Greenville, SC	Wade Hampton High School	6 ft 0 in (1.83 m)	N/A	
Preston Parks; PG	Recruit ratings: (NR)				
Leandro Allende; SF	Hollywood, FL	Chaminade-Madonna College Preparatory School	6 ft 6 in (1.98 m)	180 lb (82 kg)	
Leandro Allende; SF	Recruit ratings: (NR)				
Overall recruit ranking:
Note: In many cases, Scout, Rivals, 247Sports, On3, and ESPN may conflict in their listings of height and weight.; In these cases, the average was taken. ESPN grades are on a 100-point scale.; Sources: "ESPN – Citadel Basketball Recruiting 2016". ESPN.; "2016 Team Ranking". Rivals.

== Roster ==
2016–17 The Citadel Bulldogs men's basketball team
Players
Coaches

Pos.	#	Name	Height	Weight	Year	Previous school	Hometown
G	0	Preston Parks	6 ft 1 in (1.85 m)	175 lb (79 kg)	Fr	Wade Hampton HS	Greenville, SC
G	1	Frankie Johnson	5 ft 9 in (1.75 m)	150 lb (68 kg)	Fr	Darlington HS	Darlington, SC
G	2	Quayson Williams	5 ft 11 in (1.8 m)	170 lb (77 kg)	So	Eastern Guilford HS	Greensboro, NC
G	3	Matt Frierson	6 ft 1 in (1.85 m)	150 lb (68 kg)	So	Chapelgate Christian Academy	Laurel, MD
F	4	Ezekiel Balogun	6 ft 6 in (1.98 m)	235 lb (107 kg)	Fr	Hamilton Heights Christian Academy	Lagos, Nigeria
G	5	Warren Sledge	6 ft 3 in (1.91 m)	180 lb (82 kg)	Sr	Keller Central HS	Keller, TX
G	10	Leandro Allende	6 ft 6 in (1.98 m)	190 lb (86 kg)	Fr	Chaminade Madonna Prep	Caguas, Puerto Rico
C	11	Tom Koopman	6 ft 8 in (2.03 m)	210 lb (95 kg)	Sr	Basketball Academy of Limburg	Weert, Netherlands
G	12	Chris Ross	6 ft 2 in (1.88 m)	170 lb (77 kg)	Fr	Goose Creek HS	Dallas, TX
G	14	Aaron Washington	6 ft 4 in (1.93 m)	190 lb (86 kg)	Fr	DME Academy	Washington, D.C.
F	21	Bobby Duncan	6 ft 4 in (1.93 m)	210 lb (95 kg)	GS	Fayetteville Christian School	Fayetteville, NC
G	23	Kaelon Harris	6 ft 4 in (1.93 m)	225 lb (102 kg)	Fr	Mundy's Mill HS	Tulsa, OK
F	24	Tyler Burgess	6 ft 7 in (2.01 m)	195 lb (88 kg)	Fr	Easley HS	Easley, SC
F	32	Brian White	6 ft 8 in (2.03 m)	205 lb (93 kg)	Sr	John Marshall HS	Richmond, VA
F	35	Zane Najdawi	6 ft 7 in (2.01 m)	205 lb (93 kg)	So	Cosby HS	Midlothian, VA
C	50	Griffin Peevey	6 ft 7 in (2.01 m)	220 lb (100 kg)	Fr	Vanguard Prep	Waco, TX

Head coach

- Duggar Baucom (UNC Charlotte)

Assistant coach(es)

- Daniel Willis (Lenoir–Rhyne)
- Ryan Mattocks (Duke)
- Willie Bell (VMI)

Legend

- (C) Team captain
- (S) Suspended
- (I) Ineligible
- (W) Walk-on
- Injured
- Current redshirt

Roster
Last update: February 18, 2024

== Schedule and results ==
The Citadel travelled to play opponents in the Pac-12, Big 12 and ACC, and host an exempt tournament to be known as the Holy City Hoops Classic.

Date time, TV	Rank^{#}	Opponent^{#}	Result	Record	Site (attendance) city, state
Exhibition
November 4, 2016*; 3:00 p.m.		North Greenville	W 97–62		McAlister Field House; Charleston, SC
Non-conference regular season
November 11, 2016*; 7:30 p.m.		at College of Charleston	L 68–81	0–1	TD Arena (4,178); Charleston, SC
November 13, 2016*; 2:00 p.m.		Johnson University Florida	W 146–84	1–1	McAlister Field House (897); Charleston, SC
November 15, 2016*; 7:00 p.m.		Truett McConnell	W 119–90	2–1	McAlister Field House (908); Charleston, SC
November 18, 2016*; 5:00 p.m.		at Stetson	W 116–112	3–1	Edmunds Center (822); DeLand, FL
November 20, 2016*; 12:00 p.m.		at No. 20 Iowa State	L 63–130	3–2	Hilton Coliseum (14,228); Ames, IA
November 23, 2016*; 2:00 p.m., P12N		at Arizona State	L 110–127	3–3	Wells Fargo Arena (4,702); Tempe, AZ
November 28, 2016*; 7:00 p.m.		Presbyterian	W 97–83	4–3	McAlister Field House (3,278); Charleston, SC
December 2, 2016*; 5:00 p.m.		Colgate; Holy City Hoops Classic	W 108–101	5–3	McAlister Field House (356); Charleston, SC
December 3, 2016*; 12:00 p.m.		USC Upstate; Holy City Hoops Classic	W 97–92	6–3	McAlister Field House (909); Charleston, SC
December 4, 2016*; 3:00 p.m.		Campbell; Holy City Hoops Classic	L 91–97	6–4	McAlister Field House (572); Charleston, SC
December 7, 2016*; 7:00 p.m.		Toccoa Falls; Holy City Hoops Classic	W 144–94	7–4	McAlister Field House (472); Charleston, SC
December 17, 2016*; 11:00 a.m.		at Virginia Tech	L 71–113	7–5	Cassell Coliseum (5,664); Blacksburg, VA
December 20, 2016*; 5:00 p.m.		at UMBC	L 111–120 ^{2OT}	7–6	Retriever Activities Center (767); Catonsville, MD
SoCon regular season
December 28, 2016; 7:00 p.m.		UNC Greensboro	L 87–95	7–7 (0–1)	McAlister Field House (1,221); Charleston, SC
December 31, 2016; 4:00 p.m.		at Furman; Rivalry	L 68–83	7–8 (0–2)	Timmons Arena (1,529); Greenville, SC
January 2, 2017; 7:00 pm		at Wofford	W 104–103 ^{OT}	8–8 (1–2)	Benjamin Johnson Arena (1,071); Spartanburg, SC
January 5, 2017; 7:00 p.m.		East Tennessee State	L 71–115	8–9 (1–3)	McAlister Field House (1,207); Charleston, SC
January 7, 2017; 1:00 p.m.		VMI; Rivalry	W 79–74	9–9 (2–3)	McAlister Field House (1,301); Charleston, SC
January 11, 2017; 7:00 p.m.		at Chattanooga	L 73–83	9–10 (2–4)	McKenzie Arena (3,143); Chattanooga, TN
January 14, 2017; 1:00 p.m.		Samford	L 90–98	9–11 (2–5)	McAlister Field House (1,175); Charleston, SC
January 19, 2017; 7:00 p.m.		at Western Carolina	L 95–100	9–12 (2–6)	Ramsey Center (1,561); Cullowhee, NC
January 21, 2017; 5:00 p.m.		at UNC Greensboro	L 72–81	9–13 (2–7)	Greensboro Coliseum (2,783); Greensboro, NC
January 28, 2017; 4:30 p.m.		at Mercer	L 66–82	9–14 (2–8)	Hawkins Arena (4,328); Macon, GA
February 2, 2017; 7:00 p.m.		Wofford	L 90–100	9–15 (2–9)	McAlister Field House (1,175); Charleston, SC
February 4, 2017; 1:00 p.m.		Furman; Rivalry	L 91–99	9–16 (2–10)	McAlister Field House (4,388); Charleston, SC
February 9, 2017; 7:00 p.m.		at East Tennessee State	L 69–90	9–17 (2–11)	Freedom Hall Civic Center (3,845); Johnson City, TN
February 11, 2017; 1:00 p.m.		at VMI; Rivalry	L 78–101	9–18 (2–12)	Cameron Hall (3,479); Lexington, VA
February 18, 2017; 1:00 p.m.		Mercer	L 78–89	9–19 (2–13)	McAlister Field House (3,809); Charleston, SC
February 22, 2017; 7:00 p.m.		Western Carolina	L 80–84	9–20 (2–14)	McAlister Field House (1,270); Charleston, SC
February 25, 2017; 7:00 p.m.		at Samford	W 102–96	10–20 (3–14)	Pete Hanna Center (2,101); Homewood, AL
February 27, 2017; 7:00 p.m., ASN		Chattanooga	W 85–76	11–20 (4–14)	McAlister Field House (3,300); Charleston, SC
SoCon tournament
March 3, 2017; 5:00 p.m., ESPN3	(9)	vs. (8) Western Carolina; First round	W 78–72	12–20	U.S. Cellular Center (2,930); Asheville, NC
March 4, 2017; 12:00 p.m., ESPN3	(9)	vs. (1) UNC Greensboro; Quarterfinals	L 67–76	12–21	U.S. Cellular Center (4,525); Asheville, NC
*Non-conference game. (#) Tournament seedings in parentheses. All times are in Eastern.
