= 2016–17 Wofford Terriers men's basketball team =

American college basketball season

2016–17 Wofford Terriers men's basketball
- Conference: Southern Conference
- Record: 16–17 (10–8 SoCon)
- Head coach: Mike Young (15th season)
- Assistant coaches: Dustin Kerns; Tim Johnson; Kevin Giltner
- Home arena: Benjamin Johnson Arena

2016–17 Southern Conference men's basketball standings
	Conf.				Overall
Team	W		L	PCT	W		L	PCT
East Tennessee State †	14	–	4	.778	27	–	8	.771
UNC Greensboro	14	–	4	.778	25	–	10	.714
Furman	14	–	4	.778	23	–	12	.657
Chattanooga	10	–	8	.556	19	–	12	.613
Wofford	10	–	8	.556	16	–	17	.485
Mercer	9	–	9	.500	15	–	17	.469
Samford	8	–	10	.444	20	–	16	.556
The Citadel	4	–	14	.222	12	–	21	.364
Western Carolina	4	–	14	.222	9	–	23	.281
VMI	3	–	15	.167	6	–	24	.200
† 2017 SoCon Tournament winner

The 2016–17 Wofford Terriers men's basketball team represented Wofford College during the 2016–17 NCAA Division I men's basketball season. The Terriers, led by 15th-year head coach Mike Young, played their home games at the Benjamin Johnson Arena in Spartanburg, South Carolina as members of the Southern Conference. They finished the season 16–17, 10–8 in SoCon play to finish in a tie for fourth place. They defeated Chattanooga in the quarterfinals of the SoCon tournament to advance to the semifinals where they lost to UNC Greensboro.

This was the final season for Benjamin Johnson Arena as an NCAA sports venue. All of the arena's tenants—Wofford men's and women's basketball, plus women's volleyball—moved to the new Jerry Richardson Indoor Stadium for the 2017–18 school year.

== Previous season ==
The Terriers finished the 2015–16 season 15–17, 11–7 in SoCon play to finish in a tie for third place. They lost in the quarterfinals of the SoCon tournament to Western Carolina.

== Roster ==
2016–17 Wofford Terriers men's basketball team
Players
Coaches

Pos.	#	Name	Height	Weight	Year	Hometown
F	0	Dishon Lowery	6 ft 6 in (1.98 m)	240 lb (109 kg)	Fr	Peachtree City, Georgia
G	1	Derrick Brooks	6 ft 4 in (1.93 m)	195 lb (88 kg)	Jr	Hinesville, Georgia
F/C	2	Michael Manning, Jr.	6 ft 8 in (2.03 m)	195 lb (88 kg)	Fr	Memphis, Tennessee
G	3	Fletcher Magee	6 ft 4 in (1.93 m)	194 lb (88 kg)	So	Orlando, Florida
G	4	Donovan Theme-Love	6 ft 1 in (1.85 m)	185 lb (84 kg)	Fr	Providence, Rhode Island
G	5	Eric Garcia	6 ft 0 in (1.83 m)	185 lb (84 kg)	Sr	Aurora, Colorado
G	10	Nathan Hoover	6 ft 4 in (1.93 m)	180 lb (82 kg)	Fr	Memphis, Tennessee
G	11	Bobby Perez	5 ft 11 in (1.8 m)	165 lb (75 kg)	Jr	Atlanta, Georgia
G	15	Trevor Stumpe	6 ft 5 in (1.96 m)	197 lb (89 kg)	So	Plainfield, Illinois
G	20	Jaylen Allen	6 ft 3 in (1.91 m)	185 lb (84 kg)	Sr	Johnson City, Tennessee
F	23	Justin Tucker	6 ft 7 in (2.01 m)	218 lb (99 kg)	Fr	Orlando, Florida
G	24	Kevon Tucker	6 ft 4 in (1.93 m)	200 lb (91 kg)	Fr	Dacula, Georgia
F	33	Cameron Jackson	6 ft 8 in (2.03 m)	235 lb (107 kg)	So	Winchester, Virginia
F	35	Ryan Sawvell	6 ft 8 in (2.03 m)	215 lb (98 kg)	RS Sr	Mundelein, Illinois
G	40	Eric Wagenlander	6 ft 2 in (1.88 m)	180 lb (82 kg)	Sr	Mount Pleasant, South Carolina
C	50	Matthew Pegram	6 ft 11 in (2.11 m)	240 lb (109 kg)	So	Mount Pleasant, South Carolina

Head coach

- Mike Young (Emory and Henry)

Assistant coach(es)

- Dustin Kerns (Clemson)
- Tim Johnson (Wofford)
- Kevin Giltner (Wofford)

Legend

- (C) Team captain
- (S) Suspended
- (I) Ineligible
- (W) Walk-on
- Injured
- Current redshirt

Roster

== Schedule and results ==
Date time, TV	Rank^{#}	Opponent^{#}	Result	Record	Site (attendance) city, state
Non-conference regular season
11/12/2016*; 2:00 pm, SECN+		at LSU	L 69–91	0–1	Pete Maravich Assembly Center (6,690); Baton Rouge, LA
11/15/2016*; 7:00 pm		Allen; Gulf Coast Showcase	W 117–77	1–1	Benjamin Johnson Arena (1,087); Spartanburg, SC
11/21/2016*; 11:00 am		vs. Vermont; Gulf Coast Showcase quarterfinals	L 59–60	1–2	Germain Arena; Estero, FL
11/22/2016*; 11:00 am		vs. Bradley; Gulf Coast Showcase consolation 2nd round	L 62–70	1–3	Germain Arena; Estero, FL
11/23/2016*; 11:00 am		vs. Kent State; Gulf Coast Showcase 7th place game	L 59–66	1–4	Germain Arena; Estero, FL
11/27/2016*; 2:00 pm, P12N		at Colorado	L 60–75	1–5	Coors Events Center (6,854); Boulder, CO
11/29/2016*; 7:00 pm		Mars Hill	W 79–76	2–5	Benjamin Johnson Arena (870); Spartanburg, SC
12/03/2016*; 5:30 pm, ESPN3		vs. Miami (FL); HoopHall Miami Invitational	L 57–74	2–6	American Airlines Arena (4,885); Miami, FL
12/06/2016*; 7:00 pm		UVA–Wise	W 116–56	3–6	Benjamin Johnson Arena (927); Spartanburg, SC
12/10/2016*; 5:00 pm, FSSW		at TCU	L 63–72	3–7	Schollmaier Arena (5,822); Fort Worth, TX
12/15/2016*; 7:00 pm		Austin Peay	W 96–77	4–7	Benjamin Johnson Arena (813); Spartanburg, SC
12/19/2016*; 7:00 pm		at Coastal Carolina	W 75–74	5–7	HTC Center (1,486); Conway, SC
12/22/2016*; 7:00 pm, ACCN Extra		at Georgia Tech	L 72–76	5–8	Hank McCamish Pavilion (4,725); Atlanta, GA
SoCon regular season
12/31/2016; 1:00 pm, ESPN3		Mercer	W 88–71	6–8 (1–0)	Benjamin Johnson Arena (1,083); Spartanburg, SC
01/02/2017; 7:00 pm, ESPN3		The Citadel	L 103–104 ^{OT}	6–9 (1–1)	Benjamin Johnson Arena (1,071); Spartanburg, SC
01/05/2017; 7:00 pm		at Chattanooga	L 66–77	6–10 (1–2)	McKenzie Arena (2,829); Chattanooga, TN
01/08/2017; 4:00 pm, ESPN3		at Samford	L 89–91 ^{OT}	6–11 (1–3)	Pete Hanna Center (1,142); Homewood, AL
01/14/2017; 7:00 pm, ESPN3		Furman	W 67–58	7–11 (2–3)	Benjamin Johnson Arena (2,675); Spartanburg, SC
01/19/2017; 7:00 pm, ESPN3		VMI	W 88–70	8–11 (3–3)	Benjamin Johnson Arena (1,458); Spartanburg, SC
01/22/2017; 2:00 pm		at East Tennessee State	L 72–79	8–12 (3–4)	Freedom Hall Civic Center (4,034); Johnson City, TN
01/25/2017; 7:00 pm, ESPN3		UNC Greensboro	W 93–74	9–12 (4–4)	Benjamin Johnson Arena (1,596); Spartanburg, SC
01/28/2017; 7:00 pm, ESPN3		at Western Carolina	L 62–68	9–13 (4–5)	Ramsey Center (1,894); Cullowhee, NC
02/02/2017; 7:00 pm		at The Citadel	W 100–90	10–13 (5–5)	McAlister Field House (1,175); Charleston, SC
02/04/2017; 4:30 pm		at Mercer	W 65–62	11–13 (6–5)	Hawkins Arena (4,386); Macon, GA
02/06/2017; 7:00 pm, ASN		East Tennessee State	W 79–76	12–13 (7–5)	Benjamin Johnson Arena (1,497); Spartanburg, SC
02/09/2017; 7:00 pm, ESPN3		Samford	W 131–127 ^{4OT}	13–13 (8–5)	Benjamin Johnson Arena (1,583); Spartanburg, SC
02/11/2017; 7:00 pm, ESPN3		Chattanooga	L 65–73	13–14 (8–6)	Benjamin Johnson Arena (3,004); Spartanburg, SC
02/15/2017; 7:00 pm, ESPN3		at UNC Greensboro	L 55–74	13–15 (8–7)	Greensboro Coliseum (2,448); Greensboro, NC
02/18/2017; 7:00 pm, ESPN3		Western Carolina	W 84–56	14–15 (9–7)	Benjamin Johnson Arena (3,317); Spartanburg, SC
02/22/2017; 7:00 pm, ESPN3		at VMI	W 81–63	15–15 (10–7)	Cameron Hall (1,310); Lexington, VA
02/25/2017; 2:00 pm		at Furman	L 69–78	15–16 (10–8)	Timmons Arena (2,582); Greenville, SC
SoCon tournament
03/04/2017; 2:30 pm, ESPN3	(5)	vs. (4) Chattanooga; Quarterfinals	W 79–67	16–16	U.S. Cellular Center (4,525); Asheville, NC
03/05/2017; 5:00 pm, ESPN3	(5)	vs. (1) UNC Greensboro; Semifinals	L 73–77	16–17	U.S. Cellular Center (5,079); Asheville, NC
*Non-conference game. ^{#}Rankings from AP Poll. (#) Tournament seedings in parentheses. All times are in Eastern Time.
