= 2017 Southern Conference men's basketball tournament =

- Classification: Division I
- Season: 2016–17
- Teams: 10
- Site: U.S. Cellular Center; Asheville, North Carolina
- Champions: East Tennessee State (7th title)
- Winning coach: Steve Forbes (1st title)
- MVP: T. J. Cromer (East Tennessee State)
- Attendance: 24,061
- Television: ESPN3, ESPN

2016–17 Southern Conference men's basketball standings
	Conf.				Overall
Team	W		L	PCT	W		L	PCT
East Tennessee State †	14	–	4	.778	27	–	8	.771
UNC Greensboro	14	–	4	.778	25	–	10	.714
Furman	14	–	4	.778	23	–	12	.657
Chattanooga	10	–	8	.556	19	–	12	.613
Wofford	10	–	8	.556	16	–	17	.485
Mercer	9	–	9	.500	15	–	17	.469
Samford	8	–	10	.444	20	–	16	.556
The Citadel	4	–	14	.222	12	–	21	.364
Western Carolina	4	–	14	.222	9	–	23	.281
VMI	3	–	15	.167	6	–	24	.200
† 2017 SoCon Tournament winner

The 2017 Southern Conference men's basketball tournament took place Friday, March 3 through Monday, March 6 in Asheville, North Carolina, at the U.S. Cellular Center. The entire tournament was streamed on ESPN3, with the Southern Conference Championship Game televised on ESPN at 7pm EST. The champion, East Tennessee State, received an automatic bid into the 2017 NCAA tournament with a 79–74 win over UNC Greensboro.

== Seeds ==
Seed	School	Conference	Overall	Tiebreaker
1	UNC Greensboro	14–4	23–8	3–1 vs Furman/ETSU
2	Furman	14–4	21–10	2–2 vs UNCG/ETSU
3	East Tennessee State	14–4	24–7	1–3 vs UNCG/Furman
4	Chattanooga	10–8	19–11	2–0 vs Wofford
5	Wofford	10–8	15–16	0–2 vs Chattanooga
6	Mercer	9–9	15–16	
7	Samford	8–10	17–14	
8	Western Carolina	4–14	9–22	2–0 vs The Citadel
9	The Citadel	4–14	11–20	0–2 vs Western Carolina
10	VMI	3–15	6–23	
† – Southern Conference regular season champions, and tournament No. 1 seed. # – Received a first round bye in the conference tournament.

== Bracket ==
First round Friday, March 3
8	Western Carolina	72
9	The Citadel	78
7	Samford	79
10	VMI	61

Quarterfinals; Saturday, March 4
1	UNC Greensboro	76
9	The Citadel	67
4	Chattanooga	67
5	Wofford	79
2	Furman	63
7	Samford	67
3	East Tennessee State	73
6	Mercer	66

Semifinals; Sunday, March 5
1	UNC Greensboro	77
5	Wofford	73
7	Samford	72
3	East Tennessee State	81

Championship; Monday, March 6
1	UNC Greensboro	74
3	East Tennessee State	79
