= Josh Sharkey =

American basketball player

No. 0 – Darüşşafaka
- Position: Point guard
- League: TBL

Personal information
- Born: September 10, 1997 (age 29) Philadelphia, Pennsylvania, U.S.
- Listed height: 5 ft 10 in (1.78 m)
- Listed weight: 170 lb (77 kg)

Career information
- High school: Abington Friends School (Jenkintown, Pennsylvania); Archbishop John Carroll (Radnor, Pennsylvania)
- College: Samford (2016–2020)
- NBA draft: 2020: undrafted
- Playing career: 2020–present

Career history
- 2020–2021: Tigers Tübingen
- 2021: Legia Warsaw
- 2021: Start Lublin
- 2022: Delaware Blue Coats
- 2022: Birmingham Squadron
- 2022–2023: Södertälje
- 2023–2024: Best Balıkesir
- 2024–2025: CS Vâlcea 1924
- 2025: Aigeleo
- 2026: Sombor
- 2026: Cañeros del Este
- 2026–present: Darüşşafaka

Career highlights
- Second-team All-SoCon (2019); Third-team All-SoCon (2020); SoCon All-Freshman Team (2016)

Josh Sharkey (born September 10, 1997) is an American professional basketball player for Darüşşafaka of the Türkiye Basketbol Ligi (TBL). He played college basketball for the Samford Bulldogs.

== Early life and high school career ==
Sharkey grew up in the Olney neighborhood of Philadelphia. As a freshman, he attended Abington Friends School alongside Tony Carr and Lamar Stevens. Sharkey transferred to Archbishop John Carroll High School as a sophomore, where he was teammates with Derrick Jones Jr. and Ryan Daly. He scored 13 points and had 10 rebounds in the 2015 PIAA Class AAA final loss to Saints John Neumann and Maria Goretti Catholic High School. Sharkey was an All-Delco performer at Archbishop Carroll. During the 2015 Peach Jam Invitational, Sharkey averaged 7.1 points per game. He committed to Samford, the only school to offer him a scholarship, over Penn.

== College career ==
Sharkey averaged 8.2 points and 4.2 assists per game as a freshman at Samford but struggled with his shooting, hitting 21.7 percent of his three-point attempts. He started two games, but mainly served as a backup to Christen Cunningham. As a sophomore, Sharkey averaged 7.3 points, 2.1 rebounds, and 5.1 assists per game. On January 24, 2019, he scored 19 points and had a school-record 16 assists in a 107–106 overtime loss to Wofford. He averaged 16.3 points and 7.2 rebounds per game as a junior, earning Second Team All-Southern Conference honors. On January 30, 2020, Sharkey scored a career-high 35 points and had seven assists in a 92–84 loss to Chattanooga. He was named to the midseason watchlist for the Lou Henson Award during his senior season. As a senior, Sharkey averaged 18 points and 7.2 rebounds per game. He was named to the Third Team All-Southern Conference. He finished his Samford career as the leader in assists (758) and steals (285) and was seventh in scoring with 1,592 points.

== Professional career ==
On September 26, 2020, Sharkey signed his first professional contract with Tigers Tübingen of the ProA. On November 3, he was recognized as ProA player of the week after contributing 28 points and 12 assists in a 103–101 win against Paderborn Baskets.

On June 23, 2021, Sharkey signed with Legia Warsaw of the Polish Basketball League. In four games, he averaged 15 points, 2.8 rebounds, 4.5 assists and two steals per game. On October 1, Sharkey signed with Start Lublin.

=== Delaware Blue Coats (2022) ===
On January 5, 2022, Sharkey was acquired via available player pool by the Delaware Blue Coats of the NBA G League. He was then later waived on January 18, 2022.

=== Birmingham Squadron (2022) ===
On March 30, 2022, Sharkey was acquired via available player pool by the Birmingham Squadron.

== Personal life ==
Jameer Nelson is a cousin of Sharkey's, as Nelson's father and Sharkey's maternal grandfather were brothers. Nelson trains with Sharkey, and he grew up a big fan of the NBA star. Sharkey's favorite musician is Meek Mill.
