= Darius Roy =

American basketball player (born 1998)

Free agent
- Position: Point guard / shooting guard

Personal information
- Born: March 3, 1998 (age 28)
- Listed height: 6 ft 2 in (1.88 m)
- Listed weight: 185 lb (84 kg)

Career information
- High school: Eisenhower (Lawton, Oklahoma)
- College: Mercer (2016–2017); Connors State (2017–2018); Milwaukee (2018–2020)
- NBA draft: 2020: undrafted
- Playing career: 2020–present

Career history
- 2020: Larisa
- 2021: Cactus Tbilisi

Darius Roy (born March 3, 1998) is an American professional basketball player who last played for Cactus Tbilisi of the Georgian Superliga. He played college basketball for Mercer, Connors State and Milwaukee.

== High school career ==
Roy attended Eisenhower High School in Lawton, Oklahoma. As a junior, he averaged 15 points and 5 assists per game while leading the Eagles to the 5A State Championship. Roy averaged 21.3 points, 4.4 rebounds, 3.3 assists and 2.8 steals per game as a senior, leading Eisenhower to a 23–5 record and the state semifinals. He was named the 2016 Oklahoma Basketball Coaches Association Class 5A Player of the Year. Roy committed to Mercer in August 2015.

== College career ==
Roy played his freshman season at Mercer. Following the season he transferred to Connors State College. As a sophomore at Connors State, Roy averaged 12.8 points, 4.8 rebounds, 5.5 assists and 1.6 steals per game on a team that finished 31–4 and reached the Elite Eight of the NJCAA National Tournament. He signed with Milwaukee in April 2018. Roy averaged 15.8 points and 4.1 assists per game as a junior, shooting 40.5 percent from three-point range on a team that finished 9–22. In Roy's senior season debut, he scored a career-high 29 points in a 115–110 triple overtime loss to Western Michigan. As a senior, he averaged 15.6 points, 4.1 rebounds, 3.0 assists and 1.4 steals per game.

== Professional career ==
On September 7, 2020, Roy signed his first professional contract with Larisa of the Greek Basket League. He left the team in October after appearing only in a single Cup game. In January 2021, Roy signed with Cactus Tbilisi of the Georgian Superliga.
