= Ramsey Center =

Arena in Cullowhee, North Carolina

Liston B. Ramsey Regional Activity Center
- "The Lair"
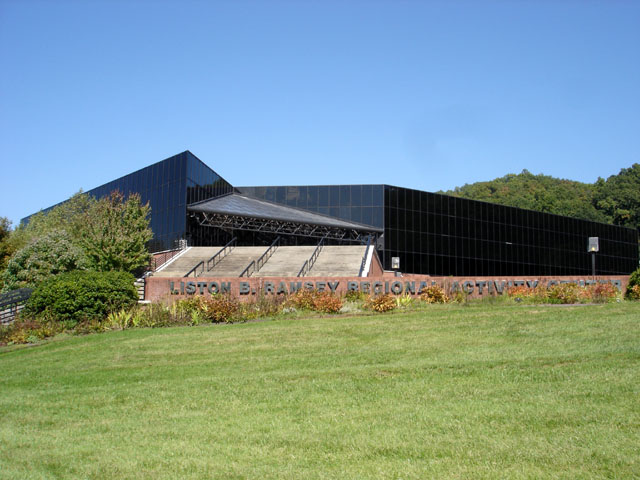
- Liston B. Ramsey Regional Activity Center
- Interactive map of Liston B. Ramsey Regional Activity Center
- Location: 92 Catamount Road; Cullowhee, NC 28723 USA
- Coordinates: 35.3037°N 83.1823°W
- Owner: Western Carolina University
- Operator: Western Carolina University
- Capacity: 7,826 (basketball); 8,556 (concerts)
- Surface: Multi-surface

Construction
- Groundbreaking: October 1982
- Opened: April 10, 1986
- Cost: $16.3 million ($47.9 million in 2025 dollars)
- Architects: Crain & Anderson, Inc. Foy & Lee Associates
- Structural engineer: Walter P Moore

Tenants
- Western Carolina Catamounts (men's and women's basketball & volleyball)

The Liston B. Ramsey Regional Activity Center is a 7,826-seat multi-purpose arena in Cullowhee, in the U.S. state of North Carolina, and is home to the Western Carolina University Catamounts basketball and volleyball teams. It is also named "The Lair". It is a state owned facility (by the University) and offers the largest seating capacity inside the Charlotte–Atlanta–Knoxville triangle.

In addition to the arena, the Ramsey Center includes five racquetball courts, two basketball courts, a walking/jogging track, and lighted outdoor rollerblade/skateboard facilities for students.

Features not in use at this time include an indoor firing range and an outdoor-lighted ice skating facility.

== History ==
The Liston B. Ramsey Regional Activity Center was completed in April 1986 and was dedicated on December 6 of that same year before a standing-room only crowd of 8,114 as Western Carolina hosted North Carolina State on the men's basketball hardwood. The first official game in the new building took place two-days prior as the women's squad downed Mars Hill on December 4, 1986, by a score of 65–61. In 1999, the Ramsey Center also became the home venue for the WCU volleyball team.

== Notable events ==
Such entertainment acts as Aerosmith, Alabama, Rascal Flatts, Montgomery Gentry, Eric Church, The Band Perry, Tim Mcgraw, The Gaither Homecoming, Billy Currington, Chicago, Fabolous, Jason Aldean, Lady Antebellum, Lorrie Morgan and Nappy Roots have played at the Ramsey Center. Other featured events include the Harlem Globetrotters, WCW Wrestling, Monster Jam, appearances by the New York City Opera, Los Angeles Ballet and the Acting Company. Lectures from famous personalities like Pat Summitt and former presidential candidate, Bob Dole have taken place at the Ramsey Center.

Bon Jovi performed at the Ramsey Center on September 23, 1986 during their Slippery When Wet Tour, and the arena is featured in the music video for the song Wanted Dead or Alive.

In 2006, it hosted the free Monster Jam Monsters on Mainstreet show.

== See also ==
- List of NCAA Division I basketball arenas
