= 2015–16 Presbyterian Blue Hose men's basketball team =

American college basketball season

2015–16 Presbyterian Blue Hose men's basketball
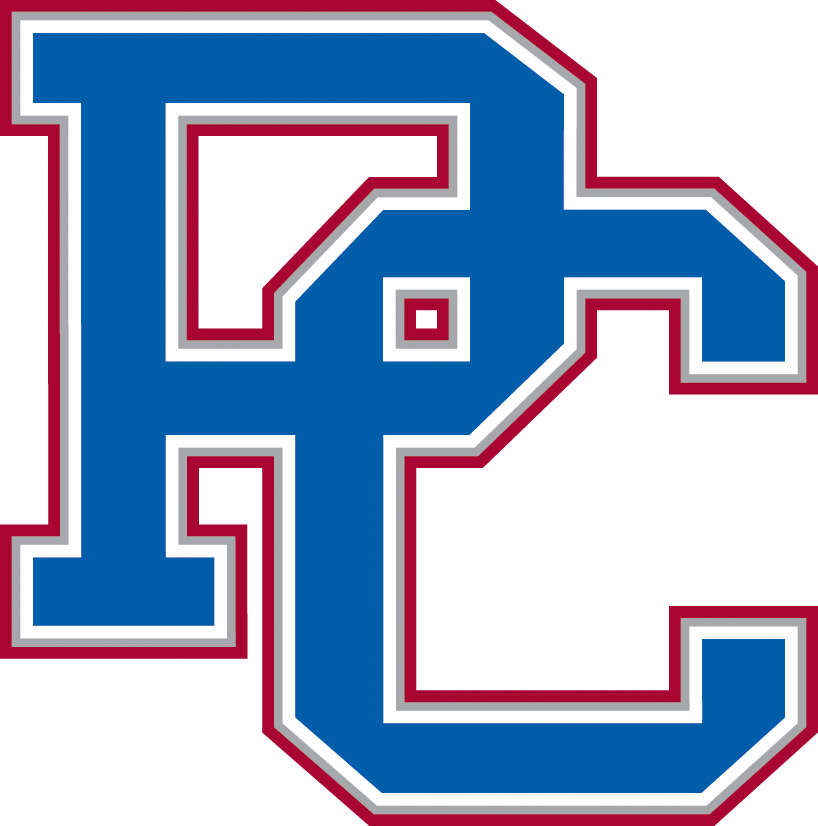
- Conference: Big South Conference
- Record: 11–20 (5–13 Big South)
- Head coach: Gregg Nibert (27th season)
- Assistant coach: Cassius Bosket; Peirre Miller; John Reynolds
- Home arena: Templeton Physical Education Center

2015–16 Big South men's basketball standings
	Conf.				Overall
Team	W		L	PCT	W		L	PCT
Winthrop	13	–	5	.722	23	–	9	.719
High Point	13	–	5	.722	21	–	11	.656
UNC Asheville †	12	–	6	.667	22	–	12	.647
Coastal Carolina	12	–	6	.667	21	–	12	.636
Gardner–Webb	10	–	8	.556	17	–	16	.515
Liberty	10	–	8	.556	13	–	19	.406
Radford	9	–	9	.500	16	–	15	.516
Campbell	5	–	13	.278	12	–	18	.400
Presbyterian	5	–	13	.278	11	–	20	.355
Longwood	5	–	13	.278	10	–	23	.303
Charleston Southern	5	–	13	.278	9	–	21	.300
† 2016 Big South tournament winner

The 2015–16 Presbyterian Blue Hose men's basketball team represented Presbyterian College during the 2015–16 NCAA Division I men's basketball season. The Blue Hose, led by 27th year head coach Gregg Nibert, played their home games at the Templeton Physical Education Center and were members of the Big South Conference. They finished the season 11–20, 5–13 in Big South play to finish a four way tie for eighth place. They defeated Radford in the first round of the Big South tournament to advance to the quarterfinals where they lost to Winthrop.

== Roster ==
Number	Name	Position	Height	Weight	Year	Hometown
0	Jaron Withers	Guard	6–4	205	Sophomore	Winston-Salem, North Carolina
1	Darius Moore	Guard	5–10	175	Freshman	Browns Summit, North Carolina
2	Markus Terry	Guard	6–2	205	Junior	Johns Creek, Georgia
3	DeSean Murray	Forward	6–5	225	Sophomore	Stanley, North Carolina
4	John Majors II	Forward	6–6	230	Junior	Upper Marlboro, Maryland
5	Davon Bell	Guard	5–10	175	Sophomore	Charlotte, North Carolina
10	Janeil Jenkins	Guard	5–10	170	Senior	Jacksonville, Florida
12	Stephen Osu	Center	6–9	250	Sophomore	Herndon, Virginia
13	Charlie Inclan	Guard	5–10	165	Junior	Spartanburg, South Carolina
14	Reggie Dillard	Guard	6–4	225	Sophomore	Greensboro, North Carolina
23	Ruben Arroyo	Forward	6–8	215	Sophomore	Patillas, Puerto Rico
24	Will Adams	Guard	5–10	183	Junior	Johnson City, Tennessee
34	Ed Drew	Forward	6–6	220	Junior	Suffolk, Virginia
35	Austin Venable	Center	6–9	250	Freshman	Homer, Georgia

== Schedule ==
Date time, TV	Opponent	Result	Record	Site (attendance) city, state
Exhibition
11/09/2015; 7:00 pm	Mars Hill	W 90–84 ^{OT}		Templeton Center (541); Clinton, SC
Regular season
11/13/2015*; 7:00 pm, ESPN3	at Furman	L 53–63	0–1	Timmons Arena (1,483); Greenville, SC
11/16/2015*; 7:00 pm	USC Upstate	W 74–73	1–1	Templeton Center (509); Clinton, SC
11/18/2015*; 7:30 pm	Toccoa Falls	W 116–75	2–1	Templeton Center (644); Clinton, SC
11/21/2015*; 7:00 pm	The Citadel	W 95–79	3–1	Templeton Center (810); Clinton, SC
11/24/2015*; 7:00 pm	at VMI	L 61–76	3–2	Cameron Hall (1,010); Lexington, VA
11/28/2015*; 7:00 pm	Wofford	L 58–68	3–3	Templeton Center (715); Clinton, SC
12/02/2015; 7:00 pm	Gardner–Webb	L 76–87	3–4 (0–1)	Templeton Center (728); Clinton, SC
12/05/2015; 4:00 pm	at Winthrop	L 70–74	3–5 (0–2)	Winthrop Coliseum (1,258); Rock Hill, SC
12/07/2015*; 7:00 pm	Montreat	W 93–69	4–5	Templeton Center (415); Clinton, SC
12/15/2015*; 7:00 pm, ESPN3	at Clemson	L 41–69	4–6	Bon Secours Wellness Arena (5,478); Greenville, SC
12/19/2015*; 2:00 pm	Piedmont	W 69–65	5–6	Templeton Center (211); Clinton, SC
12/22/2015*; 12:00 pm	at Richmond	L 44–74	5–7	Robins Center (6–056); Richmond, VA
12/27/2015*; 2:00 pm	at Marquette	L 66–84	5–8	BMO Harris Bradley Center (12,226); Milwaukee, WI
01/02/2016; 2:00 pm	at Campbell	W 70–63	6–8 (1–2)	Gore Arena (1,375); Buies Creek, NC
01/06/2016; 7:00 pm	Longwood	W 78–65	7–8 (2–2)	Templeton Center (264); Clinton, SC
01/09/2016; 4:00 pm	at High Point	L 66–82	7–9 (2–3)	Millis Athletic Center (1,593); High Point, NC
01/14/2016; 7:00 pm	at Coastal Carolina	L 58–87	8–10 (2–4)	HTC Center (2,117); Conway, SC
01/16/2016; 7:00 pm	Radford	W 69–68	8–10 (3–4)	Templeton Center (797); Clinton, SC
01/20/2016; 7:00 pm	Charleston Southern	L 72–73	8–11 (3–5)	Templeton Center (690); Clinton, SC
01/23/2016; 4:30 pm	at UNC Asheville	L 55–67	8–12 (3–6)	Kimmel Arena (1,034); Asheville, NC
01/30/2016; 7:30 pm	Liberty	L 61–65	8–13 (3–7)	Templeton Center (1,616); Clinton, SC
02/03/2016; 7:00 pm	Coastal Carolina	L 66–69	8–14 (3–8)	Templeton Center (598); Clinton, SC
02/06/2016; 4:00 pm	at Gardner–Webb	L 66–69 ^{OT}	8–15 (3–9)	Paul Porter Arena (1,745); Boiling Springs, NC
02/11/2016; 7:30 pm	at Charleston Southern	L 63–77	8–16 (3–10)	CSU Field House (686); North Charleston, SC
02/13/2016; 7:30 pm	Campbell	L 61–91	8–17 (3–11)	Templeton Center (519); Clinton, SC
02/18/2016; 7:00 pm	UNC Asheville	L 61–70	8–18 (3–12)	Templeton Center (606); Clinton, SC
02/20/2016; 7:00 pm	at Liberty	W 79–73	9–18 (4–12)	Vines Center (4,323); Lynchburg, VA
02/25/2016; 7:00 pm	at Longwood	W 74–73	10–18 (5–12)	Willett Hall (1,387); Farmville, VA
02/27/2016; 7:00 pm	High Point	L 60–80	10–19 (5–13)	Templeton Center (539); Clinton, SC
Big South tournament
03/03/2016; 4:30 pm	vs. Radford; First round	W 65–64	11–19	Gore Arena (2,991); Buies Creek, NC
03/04/2016; 6:00 pm, ESPN3	vs. Winthrop; Quarterfinals	L 53–67	11–20	Gore Arena (2,035); Buies Creek, NC
*Non-conference game. ^{#}Rankings from AP Poll. (#) Tournament seedings in parentheses. All times are in Eastern Time.
