= 2015–16 Charleston Southern Buccaneers men's basketball team =

American college basketball season

2015–16 Charleston Southern Buccaneers men's basketball
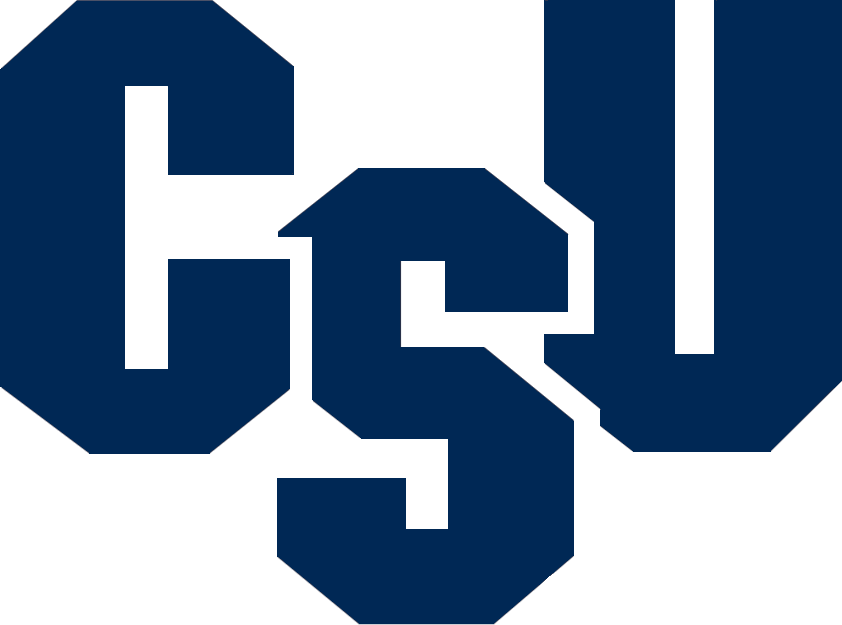
- Conference: Big South Conference
- Record: 9–21 (5–13 Big South)
- Head coach: Barclay Radebaugh (11th season)
- Assistant coaches: BJ McKie; Ahmad Smith; Joey Murdock
- Home arena: CSU Field House

2015–16 Big South men's basketball standings
	Conf.				Overall
Team	W		L	PCT	W		L	PCT
Winthrop	13	–	5	.722	23	–	9	.719
High Point	13	–	5	.722	21	–	11	.656
UNC Asheville †	12	–	6	.667	22	–	12	.647
Coastal Carolina	12	–	6	.667	21	–	12	.636
Gardner–Webb	10	–	8	.556	17	–	16	.515
Liberty	10	–	8	.556	13	–	19	.406
Radford	9	–	9	.500	16	–	15	.516
Campbell	5	–	13	.278	12	–	18	.400
Presbyterian	5	–	13	.278	11	–	20	.355
Longwood	5	–	13	.278	10	–	23	.303
Charleston Southern	5	–	13	.278	9	–	21	.300
† 2016 Big South tournament winner

The 2015–16 Charleston Southern Buccaneers men's basketball team represented Charleston Southern University during the 2015–16 NCAA Division I men's basketball season. The Buccaneers, led by eleventh year head coach Barclay Radebaugh, played their home games at the CSU Field House and were members of the Big South Conference. They finished the season 9–21, 5–13 in Big South play to finish in a four way tie for eighth place. They lost in the first round of the Big South tournament to Longwood.

== Roster ==
Number	Name	Position	Height	Weight	Year	Hometown
0	Melvin Brooks	Forward	6–7	220	Freshamn	Fort Lauderdale, Florida
1	Armel Potter	Guard	6–1	180	Freshman	Marietta, Georgia
2	Aaron Wheeler	Forward	6–4	190	Senior	Morristown, Tennessee
4	Patrick Wallace	Guard	6–1	170	Junior	Charlotte, North Carolina
10	Danny Upchurch	Guard	6–0	170	Sophomore	Bridgeport, Connecticut
11	Wesley Johnson	Forward	6–8	230	Sophomore	Greenville, South Carolina
12	Antwan Maxwell, Jr.	Forward	6–7	220	Freshman	Savannah, Georgia
13	Jantzen Colie Raymond	Guard	6–3	180	Sophomore	Columbia, South Carolina
14	Raemond Robinson	Guard	6–3	190	Junior	Goose Creek, South Carolina
20	Demetrius Pllard	Guard	6–2	200	Senior	Virginia Beach, Virginia
21	Jabbar Washington	Forward	6–3	180	Senior	Michigan City, Indiana
22	Zack Durkee	Forward	6–3	180	Sophomore	Anderson, South Carolina
23	Javis Howard	Forward	6–8	210	Sophomore	Irmo, South Carolina
24	Ugo Mmonu	Forward	6–6	205	Junior	Osina, Nigeria
44	Reuben King	Forward	6–4	215	Senior	Brooklyn, New York
	TayVaughn Major	Guard	6–2	150	Freshman	North Charleston, South Carolina

== Schedule ==
Date time, TV	Opponent	Result	Record	Site (attendance) city, state
Regular season
11/13/2015*; 8:00 pm, ESPN3	at No. 10 Wichita State	L 63–88	0–1	Charles Koch Arena (10,506); Wichita, KS
11/15/2015*; 8:00 pm, P12N	at Stanford; NIT Season Tip-Off	L 59–93	0–2	Maples Pavilion (3,427); Stanford, CA
11/18/2015*; 7:30 pm	Johnson & Wales–Charlotte	W 97–65	1–2	CSU Field House (884); Charleston, SC
11/20/2015*; 6:00 pm, SECN+	at Arkansas; NIT Season Tip-Off	L 75–93	1–3	Bud Walton Arena (14,203); Fayetteville, AR
11/24/2015*; 7:30 pm	East Tennessee State; NIT Season Tip-Off	W 77–76	2–3	CSU Field House (905); Charleston, SC
11/27/2015*; 7:00 pm	at Akron; NIT Season Tip-Off	L 58–82	2–4	James A. Rhodes Arena (2,469); Akron, OH
12/02/2015; 7:30 pm	Winthrop	L 82–83	2–5 (0–1)	CSU Field House (919); Charleston, SC
12/05/2015; 2:00 pm, ESPN3	at Liberty	W 68–61	3–5 (1–1)	Vines Center (2,356); Lynchburg, VA
12/12/2015*; 5:30 pm	Rider	L 72–82	3–6	CSU Field House (512); Charleston, SC
12/14/2015*; 7:30 pm	Columbia International	W 107–74	4–6	CSU Field House (363); Charleston, SC
12/17/2015*; 7:00 pm, ESPN3	at Wright State	L 65–71	4–7	Nutter Center (3,225); Fairborn, OH
12/21/2015*; 2:00 pm, ESPN3	at Florida State	L 64–75	4–8	Donald L. Tucker Civic Center (4,979); Tallahassee, FL
12/29/2015*; 7:30 pm	St. Andrews	W 92–39	5–8	CSU Field House (331); Charleston, SC
01/02/2016; 5:30 pm	High Point	L 73–78	5–9 (1–2)	CSU Field House (881); Charleston, SC
01/06/2016; 7:00 pm	at Radford	L 73–80	5–10 (1–3)	Dedmon Center (1,011); Radford, VA
01/09/2016; 5:30 pm	UNC Asheville	L 73–83	5–11 (1–4)	CSU Field House (775); Charleston, SC
01/14/2016; 7:30 pm	Liberty	W 64–63	6–11 (2–4)	CSU Field House (877); Charleston, SC
01/16/2016; 4:00 pm, ASN	at Campbell	W 82–75	7–11 (3–4)	Gore Arena (1,715); Buies Creek, NC
01/20/2016; 7:00 pm	at Presbyterian	W 73–72	8–11 (4–4)	Templeton Center (690); Clinton, SC
01/23/2016; 5:30 pm	Coastal Carolina	L 63–78	8–12 (4–5)	CSU Field House (972); Charleston, SC
01/27/2016; 7:00 pm	at Winthrop	L 72–97	8–13 (4–6)	Winthrop Coliseum (1,198); Rock Hill, SC
01/30/2016; 5:30 pm	Gardner–Webb	L 59–68	8–14 (4–7)	CSU Field House (788); Charleston, SC
02/03/2016; 7:00 pm	at UNC Asheville	L 55–63	8–15 (4–8)	Kimmel Arena (1,927); Asheville, NC
02/06/2016; 5:30 pm	Longwood	W 78–76 ^{2OT}	8–16 (4–9)	CSU Field House (711); Charleston, SC
02/11/2016; 7:30 pm	Presbyterian	W 77–63	9–16 (5–9)	CSU Field House (686); Charleston, SC
02/13/2016; 7:00 pm, ESPN3	at High Point	L 50–72	9–17 (5–10)	Millis Athletic Center (1,750); High Point, NC
02/18/2016; 7:00 pm, ESPNU	at Gardner–Webb	L 74–86	9–18 (5–11)	Paul Porter Arena (1,383); Boiling Springs, NC
02/20/2016; 5:30 pm	Campbell	L 72–74	9–19 (5–12)	CSU Field House; Charleston, SC
02/25/2016; 7:00 pm	at Coastal Carolina	L 60–68	9–20 (5–13)	HTC Center (2,514); Conway, SC
Big South tournament
03/03/2016; 2:00 pm	vs. Longwood; First round	L 69–75	9–21	Gore Arena (2,991); Buies Creek, NC
*Non-conference game. ^{#}Rankings from AP Poll. (#) Tournament seedings in parentheses. All times are in Eastern Time.
