= 2015–16 Gardner–Webb Runnin' Bulldogs men's basketball team =

American college basketball season

2015–16 Gardner–Webb Runnin' Bulldogs men's basketball
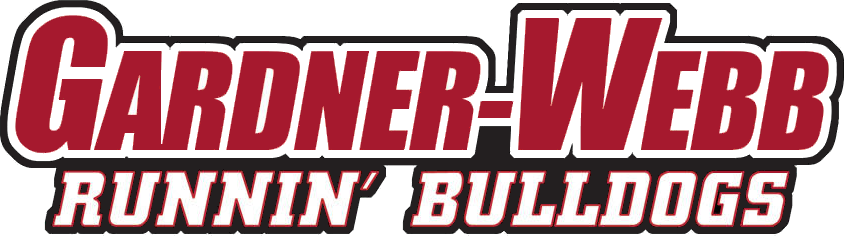
- Conference: Big South Conference
- Record: 17–16 (10–8 Big South)
- Head coach: Tim Craft (3rd season)
- Assistant coaches: Jeremy Luther; Paul Hemrick; DeAntoine Beasley
- Home arena: Paul Porter Arena

2015–16 Big South men's basketball standings
	Conf.				Overall
Team	W		L	PCT	W		L	PCT
Winthrop	13	–	5	.722	23	–	9	.719
High Point	13	–	5	.722	21	–	11	.656
UNC Asheville †	12	–	6	.667	22	–	12	.647
Coastal Carolina	12	–	6	.667	21	–	12	.636
Gardner–Webb	10	–	8	.556	17	–	16	.515
Liberty	10	–	8	.556	13	–	19	.406
Radford	9	–	9	.500	16	–	15	.516
Campbell	5	–	13	.278	12	–	18	.400
Presbyterian	5	–	13	.278	11	–	20	.355
Longwood	5	–	13	.278	10	–	23	.303
Charleston Southern	5	–	13	.278	9	–	21	.300
† 2016 Big South tournament winner

The 2015–16 Gardner–Webb Runnin' Bulldogs men's basketball team represented Gardner–Webb University during the 2015–16 NCAA Division I men's basketball season. The Runnin' Bulldogs, led by third year head coach Tim Craft, played their home games at the Paul Porter Arena and were members of the Big South Conference. They finished the season 17–16, 10–8 in Big South play to finish in a tie for fifth place. They defeated Campbell and Coastal Carolina to advance to the semifinals of the Big South tournament where they lost to Winthrop.

== Roster ==
Number	Name	Position	Height	Weight	Year	Hometown
0	Jamaal Robateau	Guard	6–5	180	Sophomore	Sunshine Coast, Queensland, Queensland
1	Justin Jenkins	Guard	6–2		Freshman	Knoxville, Tennessee
2	Eric Jamison	Guard/Forward	6–4	175	Freshman	East Point, Georgia
3	Laquincy Rideau	Guard	6–1	190	Freshman	Pompano Beach, Florida
4	Harold McBride	Guard	6–0	175	Senior	Bronx, New York
5	Dylan Poston	Guard	6–4	190	Senior	Myrtle Beach, South Carolina
11	David Efianayi	Guard	6–2	170	Freshman	Orlando, Florida
14	Brandon Miller	Forward/Center	6–6	240	Freshman	Orlando, Florida
20	Tyrell Nelson	Center	6–7	235	Junior	Charlotte, North Carolina
21	Herve Aholode	Forward	6–6	235	Senior	Cotonou, Benin
22	Daniel "DJ" Laster	Forward	6–6	200	Freshman	Pensacola, Florida
23	Andonis Burbage	Guard	6–5	200	Senior	Orlando, Florida
24	Isaiah Ivey	Guard	6–2	190	Senior	Georgetown, Kentucky
31	L'Hassane Niangane	Center	6–10	240	Sophomore	Chalon, France
32	Jonovan Watts	Forward	6–6	190	Sophomore	Durham, North Carolina
35	Jerick Hayes	Guard	5–11		Freshman	Shelby, North Carolina

== Schedule ==
Date time, TV	Opponent	Result	Record	Site (attendance) city, state
Regular season
11/13/2015*; 9:30 pm, ESPN3	at Iowa	L 59–76	0–1	Carver–Hawkeye Arena (14,209); Iowa City, IA
11/16/2015*; 8:00 pm	at No. 17 Vanderbilt	L 62–98	0–2	Memorial Gymnasium (9,728); Nashville, TN
11/19/2015*; 8:00 pm	Toccoa Falls	W 125–79	1–2	Paul Porter Arena (854); Boiling Springs, NC
11/22/2015*; 12:00 pm, SECN	at Tennessee; Barclays Center Classic	L 64–89	1–3	Thompson–Boling Arena (11,911); Knoxville, TN
11/24/2015*; 11:00 am	at George Washington; Barclays Center Classic	L 65–94	1–4	Charles E. Smith Center (3,796); Washington, D.C.
11/27/2015*; 5:00 pm	vs. Southeastern Louisiana; Barclays Center Classic	W 77–68	2–4	Christl Arena (886); West Point, NY
11/28/2015*; 7:30 pm	vs. Army; Barclays Center Classic	L 98-103 ^{OT}	2–5	Christl Arena (588); West Point, NY
12/02/2015; 7:00 pm	at Presbyterian	W 87–76	3–5 (1–0)	Templeton Center (728); Clinton, SC
12/05/2015; 7:00 pm	High Point	L 64–66	3–6 (1–1)	Paul Porter Arena (931); Boiling Springs, NC
12/12/2015*; 4:00 pm	at Furman	W 73–53	4–6	Timmons Arena (1,204); Greenville, SC
12/16/2015*; 7:00 pm, SECN	at LSU	L 57–78	4–7	Pete Maravich Assembly Center (8,896); Baton Rouge, LA
12/18/2015*; 11:30 am	Warren Wilson	W 107–62	5–7	Paul Porter Arena (834); Boiling Springs, NC
12/21/2015*; 7:00 pm	VMI	L 75–76	5–8	Paul Porter Arena (781); Boiling Springs, NC
12/28/2015*; 7:00 pm	Middle Georgia	W 101–78	6–8	Paul Porter Arena (745); Boiling Springs, NC
12/02/2015; 2:00 pm	Coastal Carolina	W 65–61	7–8 (2–1)	Paul Porter Arena (1,345); Boiling Springs, NC
01/02/2016; 6:00 pm	at Longwood	W 67–66	8–8 (3–1)	Willett Hall (1,028); Farmville, VA
01/06/2016; 2:00 pm	Campbell	W 71–68	9–8 (4–1)	Paul Porter Arena (989); Boiling Springs, NC
01/09/2016; 4:30 pm	Radford	W 83–61	10–8 (5–1)	Paul Porter Arena (1,363); Boiling Springs, NC
01/16/2016; 2:00 pm	at UNC Asheville	L 69–75	10–9 (5–2)	Kimmel Arena (2,218); Asheville, NC
01/20/2016; 7:00 pm	Winthrop	L 58–71	10–10 (5–3)	Paul Porter Arena (1,174); Boiling Springs, NC
01/24/2016; 12:00 pm	at Radford	L 59–69	10–11 (5–4)	Dedmon Center (1,011); Radford, VA
01/27/2016; 7:00 pm	Liberty	L 55–69	10–12 (5–5)	Paul Porter Arena (893); Boiling Springs, NC
01/30/2016; 5:30 pm	at Charleston Southern	W 68–59	11–12 (6–5)	CSU Field House (788); Charleston, SC
02/03/2016; 7:00 pm	at High Point	W 79–74	12–12 (7–5)	Millis Athletic Center (1,597); High Point, NC
02/06/2016; 4:30 pm, ESPN3	Presbyterian	W 69–66 ^{OT}	13–12 (8–5)	Paul Porter Arena (1,745); Boiling Springs, NC
02/11/2016; 7:00 pm	at Campbell	L 85–89 ^{OT}	13–13 (8–6)	Gore Arena (1,437); Buies Creek, NC
02/13/2016; 2:00 pm	at Coastal Carolina	L 71–78	13–14 (8–7)	HTC Center (2,157); Conway, SC
02/18/2016; 7:00 pm, ESPNU	Charleston Southern	W 84–76	14–14 (9–7)	Paul Porter Arena (1,383); Boiling Springs, NC
02/20/2016; 7:00 pm, ESPN3	Longwood	W 81–71	15–14 (10–7)	Paul Porter Arena (1,854); Boiling Springs, NC
02/27/2016; 12:00 pm, ASN	at Liberty	L 81–86	15–15 (10–8)	Vines Center (2,800); Lynchburg, VA
Big South tournament
03/03/2016; 7:00 pm	at Campbell; First round	W 79–69	16–15	Gore Arena (2,991); Buies Creek, NC
03/04/2016; 8:00 pm, ESPN3	vs. Coastal Carolina; Quarterfinals	W 69–65	17–15	Gore Arena (2,035); Buies Creek, NC
03/05/2016; 3:00 pm, ESPN3	vs. Winthrop; Semifinals	L 69–82	17–16	Gore Arena (2,580); Buies Creek, NC
*Non-conference game. ^{#}Rankings from AP Poll. (#) Tournament seedings in parentheses. All times are in Eastern Time.
