= 2015–16 High Point Panthers men's basketball team =

American college basketball season

2015–16 High Point Panthers men's basketball

Big South regular season co–champions

NIT, First round
- Conference: Big South Conference
- Record: 21–11 (13–5 Big South)
- Head coach: Scott Cherry (7th season)
- Assistant coaches: Ahmad Dorsett; Trey Brown; Eric Grabriel
- Home arena: Millis Athletic Center

2015–16 Big South men's basketball standings
	Conf.				Overall
Team	W		L	PCT	W		L	PCT
Winthrop	13	–	5	.722	23	–	9	.719
High Point	13	–	5	.722	21	–	11	.656
UNC Asheville †	12	–	6	.667	22	–	12	.647
Coastal Carolina	12	–	6	.667	21	–	12	.636
Gardner–Webb	10	–	8	.556	17	–	16	.515
Liberty	10	–	8	.556	13	–	19	.406
Radford	9	–	9	.500	16	–	15	.516
Campbell	5	–	13	.278	12	–	18	.400
Presbyterian	5	–	13	.278	11	–	20	.355
Longwood	5	–	13	.278	10	–	23	.303
Charleston Southern	5	–	13	.278	9	–	21	.300
† 2016 Big South tournament winner

The 2015–16 High Point Panthers men's basketball team represented High Point University during the 2015–16 NCAA Division I men's basketball season. The Panthers, led by seventh year head coach Scott Cherry, played their home games at the Millis Athletic Convocation Center and were members of the Big South Conference. They finished the season 21–11, 13–5 in Big South play to win a share of the regular season championship. They defeated Longwood in the quarterfinals of the Big South tournament to advance to the semifinals where they lost to UNC Asheville. As a regular season conference champion and #1 seed in their conference tournament, they received an automatic bid to the National Invitation Tournament where they lost in the first round to South Carolina.

== Previous season ==
The Panthers finished the 2014–15 season with a record of 23–10, 13–5 in conference and tied for first place. They lost in the quarterfinals of the Big South tournament to Gardner–Webb. They received a bid to the CIT where they lost to Eastern Kentucky in the second round.

== Roster ==
Number	Name	Position	Height	Weight	Year	Hometown
0	John Brown	Forward	6–8	205	Senior-RS	Jacksonville, Florida
2	Austin White	Guard	6–0	180	Sophomore	South Orange, New Jersey
3	Andre Fox	Guard	6–4	180	Freshman	Greenbelt, Maryland
5	DeAndre Barber	Guard	6–2	185	Sophomore	Virginia Beach, Virginia
10	Tarique Thompson	Forward	6–5	210	Junior	Raeford, North Carolina
11	Haiishen McIntyre	Guard	6–2	175	Senior	Harrisburg, Pennsylvania
12	Jorge Perez-Laham	Guard	6–1	187	Junior	Canóvanas, Puerto Rico
15	Lorenzo Cugini	Forward	6–7	225	Senior	Stow, Ohio
20	K.J. James	Forward	6–6	220	Sophomore	Charleston, South Carolina
22	Adam Weary	Guard	6–3	205	Senior	Memphis, Tennessee
24	Anthony Lindauer	Guard	6–3	170	Junior	Moline, Illinois
25	Ricky Madison	Forward	6–7	207	Freshman	Norcross, Georgia
33	Miles Bowman	Forward	6–6	215	Senior	Winston-Salem, North Carolina

== Schedule ==
Date time, TV	Rank^{#}	Opponent^{#}	Result	Record	Site (attendance) city, state
Regular season
November 13*; 9:00PM, FCS		at Texas Tech	L 73–77	0–1	United Supermarkets Arena (5,881); Lubbock, Texas
November 15*; 4:00PM		NC Wesleyan	W 93–69	1–1	Millis Athletic Center (1,237); High Point, North Carolina
November 18*; 7:00PM		at Drexel	W 75–66	2–1	Daskalakis Athletic Center (1,413); Philadelphia
November 21*; 7:00PM		Western Carolina	W 75–69	3–1	Millis Athletic Center (1,750); High Point, North Carolina
November 25*; 5:00PM, ESPNU		at Georgia	L 46–49	3–2	Stegeman Coliseum (5,348); Athens, Georgia
November 28*; 4:00PM		Morgan State	W 82–72	4–2	Millis Athletic Center (1,005); High Point, North Carolina
December 2; 7:00PM		Longwood	W 90–66	5–2 (1–0)	Millis Athletic Center (1,750); High Point, North Carolina
December 5; 7:00PM		at Gardner–Webb	W 66–64	6–2 (2–0)	Paul Porter Arena (931); Boiling Springs, North Carolina
December 9*; 7:00PM		UNC Greensboro	W 90–72	7–2	Millis Athletic Center (1,750); High Point, North Carolina
December 13*; 4:00PM		Virginia-Wise	W 111–74	8–2	Millis Athletic Center (1,507); High Point, North Carolina
December 16*; 7:00PM, ESPN3		at NC State	L 73–76	8–3	PNC Arena (15,602); Raleigh, North Carolina
December 21*; 7:00PM		at William & Mary	L 75–78	8–4	Kaplan Arena (1,388); Williamsburg, Virginia
December 28*; 7:00PM		Methodist	W 96-50	9–4	Millis Athletic Center (1,103); High Point, North Carolina
December 31; 7:00PM		Radford	W 77–60	10–4 (3–0)	Millis Athletic Center (1,107); High Point, North Carolina
January 2; 5:30 pm		at Charleston Southern	W 78–73	11–4 (4–0)	CSU Field House (881); North Charleston, South Carolina
January 9; 4:00PM		Presbyterian	W 82–66	12–4 (5–0)	Millis Athletic Center (1,593); High Point, North Carolina
January 14; 7:00PM, ESPNU		at Winthrop	L 66–86	12–5 (5–1)	Winthrop Coliseum (1,471); Rock Hill, South Carolina
January 16; 7:00PM, ESPN3		Coastal Carolina	L 68–71	12–6 (5–2)	Millis Athletic Center (1,750); High Point, North Carolina
January 20; 7:00PM		UNC Asheville	W 73–69	13–6 (6–2)	Millis Athletic Center (1,629); High Point, North Carolina
January 23; 12:00PM, ASN		at Liberty	L 67–69	13–7 (6–3)	Vines Center (2,526); Lynchburg, Virginia
January 27; 7:00PM		at Campbell	W 73–63	14–7 (7–3)	Gore Arena (1,465); Buies Creek, North Carolina
February 3; 7:00PM		Gardner–Webb	L 74–79	14–8 (7–4)	Millis Athletic Center (1,597); High Point, North Carolina
February 6; 7:00PM		Liberty	L 76–80	14–9 (7–5)	Millis Athletic Center (1,750); High Point, North Carolina
February 11; 7:00PM		at Coastal Carolina	W 68–67	15–9 (8–5)	HTC Center (2,395); Conway, South Carolina
February 13; 7:00PM, ESPN3		Charleston Southern	W 72–50	16–9 (9–5)	Millis Athletic Center (1,750); High Point, North Carolina
February 18; 7:00PM		at Longwood	W 88–80	17–9 (10–5)	Willett Hall (1,218); Farmville, Virginia
February 20; 4:30PM		at Radford	W 75–72 ^{OT}	18–9 (11–5)	Dedmon Center (2,331); Radford, Virginia
February 25; 7:00PM, ESPNU		Winthrop	W 87-85	19–9 (12–5)	Millis Athletic Center (1,750); High Point, North Carolina
February 27; 7:00PM		at Presbyterian	W 80–60	20–9 (13–5)	Templeton Center (539); Clinton, South Carolina
Big South tournament
March 4; 12:00PM, ESPN3	(1)	vs. (8) Longwood; Quarterfinals	W 89–78	21–9	Gore Arena (1,505); Buies Creek, North Carolina
March 5; 1:00PM, ESPN3	(1)	vs. (4) UNC Asheville; Semifinals	L 69–80	21–10	Gore Arena (2,580); Buies Creek, North Carolina
NIT
March 15*; 7:00PM, ESPNU	(8)	at (1) South Carolina; First round – South Carolina Bracket	L 66–88	21–11	Colonial Life Arena (2,566); Columbia, South Carolina
*Non-conference game. (#) Tournament seedings in parentheses. All times are in Eastern Time.
