= 2015–16 Longwood Lancers men's basketball team =

American college basketball season

2015–16 Longwood Lancers men's basketball
- Conference: Big South Conference
- Record: 10–23 (5–13 Big South)
- Head coach: Jayson Gee (3rd season)
- Associate head coach: Jake Luhn (3rd season)
- Assistant coaches: Samba Johnson (2nd season); Adam Williams (1st season)
- Home arena: Willett Hall

2015–16 Big South men's basketball standings
	Conf.				Overall
Team	W		L	PCT	W		L	PCT
Winthrop	13	–	5	.722	23	–	9	.719
High Point	13	–	5	.722	21	–	11	.656
UNC Asheville †	12	–	6	.667	22	–	12	.647
Coastal Carolina	12	–	6	.667	21	–	12	.636
Gardner–Webb	10	–	8	.556	17	–	16	.515
Liberty	10	–	8	.556	13	–	19	.406
Radford	9	–	9	.500	16	–	15	.516
Campbell	5	–	13	.278	12	–	18	.400
Presbyterian	5	–	13	.278	11	–	20	.355
Longwood	5	–	13	.278	10	–	23	.303
Charleston Southern	5	–	13	.278	9	–	21	.300
† 2016 Big South tournament winner

The 2015–16 Longwood Lancers men's basketball team represented Longwood University during the 2015–16 NCAA Division I men's basketball season. The team was led by head coach Jayson Gee, in his third season, and played their home games at Willett Hall in Farmville, Virginia as members of the Big South Conference. It was the program's fortieth season of NCAA competition. They finished the season 10–23, 5–13 in Big South play to finish in a four-way tie for eighth place. They defeated Radford in the first round of the Big South tournament to advance to the quarterfinals where they lost to High Point.

== Last season ==
The 2014–15 Lancers finished the season 11–23, 5–13 in Big South play to finish in ninth place. They upset Presbyterian and regular season champion Charleston Southern to advance to the semifinals of the Big South tournament, where they lost to Winthrop.

=== Departures ===
Name	Number	Pos.	Height	Weight	Year	Hometown	Notes
Ryan Badowski	23	G	6'3"	185	Freshman	Cleveland, Ohio	Transferred to Hillsdale College
Quincy Taylor	25	G	6'0"	180	RS Senior	Wichita, Kansas	Graduated
Tyler Akers	30	G	6'4"	180	Senior	Wytheville, Virginia	Graduated
Jason Pimentel	5	F	6'8"	230	RS Senior	Ocala, Florida	Suspended/Left team

== Class of 2015 signees ==
College recruiting
Name	Hometown	School	Height	Weight	Commit date
Al Burge; SG	Garfield Heights, Ohio	Garfield Heights High School/South Carolina Sports Academy	6 ft 4 in (1.93 m)	190 lb (86 kg)	June 28, 2013
Al Burge; SG	Recruit ratings: Scout: Rivals: 247Sports: ESPN:				
Chris Shields; SF	Hedgesville, West Virginia	Fishburne Military School	6 ft 8 in (2.03 m)	192 lb (87 kg)	August 10, 2015
Chris Shields; SF	Recruit ratings: Scout: Rivals: 247Sports: ESPN:				
Overall recruit ranking:
Note: In many cases, Scout, Rivals, 247Sports, On3, and ESPN may conflict in their listings of height and weight.; In these cases, the average was taken. ESPN grades are on a 100-point scale.; Sources:

=== Coaching changes ===
On April 24, Jake Luhn was promoted to associate head coach. On June 17, Craig Carter was named an assistant coach at Cornell. On July 7, former Marshall standout Adam Williams was named his replacement. Two days later, former Georgia student manager Cody Anderson was named director of basketball operations.

== Roster ==
On October 9, Johnson and forward Jason Pimentel were suspended indefinitely, following their arrest on marijuana possession charges. On November 3, Geter was placed on a medical redshirt for the season due to a shoulder surgery. Three days later, Fisher was suspended for four games (including an exhibition game) for an unspecified violation of team rules. On December 2, the Longwood athletic department announced that Pimentel "will not return" to the team", while Johnson would return for the December 12 game against Richmond. On February 3, the Longwood student newspaper The Rotunda reported that Dorsey was redshirting for the season.

2015–16 Longwood Lancers men's basketball team
Players
Coaches

Pos.	#	Name	Height	Weight	Year	Previous school	Hometown
G	0	Tra'Vaughn White	5 ft 10 in (1.78 m)	190 lb (86 kg)	RS Sr	Washington HS/Independence CC/Duquesne	Kansas City, Kansas
G	1	Leron Fisher	5 ft 11 in (1.8 m)	160 lb (73 kg)	Jr	Lake Clifton Eastern HS/Allan Hancock	Baltimore, Maryland
G	2	Bryan Gee	6 ft 0 in (1.83 m)	175 lb (79 kg)	RS Fr	Cornerstone Christian	Cleveland, Ohio
G	3	Darrion Allen	6 ft 2 in (1.88 m)	165 lb (75 kg)	Jr	Blanche Ely HS	Pompano Beach, Florida
F	4	Khris Lane	6 ft 6 in (1.98 m)	225 lb (102 kg)	RS So	Benedictine HS/Drexel	Richmond, Virginia
F/C	10	Lotanna Nwogbo	6 ft 8 in (2.03 m)	255 lb (116 kg)	RS Sr	Mount Vernon Presbyterian/Tulane	Lithonia, Georgia
G	11	Kanayo Obi-Rapu Jr.	6 ft 3 in (1.91 m)	190 lb (86 kg)	So	New Garden Friends	Greensboro, North Carolina
F	12	Jacob Thibodeau (W)	6 ft 5 in (1.96 m)	190 lb (86 kg)	Fr	Westfield High School	Chantilly, Virginia
F	14	Victor Dorsey (redshirt)	6 ft 9 in (2.06 m)	200 lb (91 kg)	So	Springfield HS	Akron, Ohio
G	15	Isaac Belton	6 ft 4 in (1.93 m)	205 lb (93 kg)	Jr	Virginia Episcopal/Fork Union Military	Salem, Virginia
G/F	21	Shaquille Johnson	6 ft 5 in (1.96 m)	220 lb (100 kg)	Sr	Milton HS/Northwest Florida	Atlanta
F	22	Aron Petros (W)	6 ft 7 in (2.01 m)	190 lb (86 kg)	Fr	Flint Hill School	Oakton, Virginia
G	23	Al Burge	6 ft 4 in (1.93 m)	190 lb (86 kg)	Fr	Garfield Heights HS/SC Sports Academy	Garfield Heights, Ohio
F	24	Damarion Geter (injured) (redshirt)	6 ft 7 in (2.01 m)	215 lb (98 kg)	Jr	Dunbar HS	Dayton, Ohio
G/F	30	Chris Shields	6 ft 8 in (2.03 m)	205 lb (93 kg)	Fr	Hedgesville HS/Fishburne Military	Hedgesville, West Virginia

Head coach

- Jayson Gee (University of Charleston)

Assistant coach(es)

- Jake Luhn (UMass Boston)
- Samba Johnson (Chaminade)
- Adam Williams (Marshall)

Legend

- (C) Team captain
- (S) Suspended
- (I) Ineligible
- (W) Walk-on
- Injured
- Current redshirt

Roster
Last update: February 4, 2016

== Schedule ==
Date time, TV	Rank^{#}	Opponent^{#}	Result	Record	High points	High rebounds	High assists	Site (attendance) city, state
Exhibition game
November 7*; 7:00 pm, BSN		Hampden–Sydney; Crosstown Showdown	W 71–68		15 – Allen	12 – Lane	5 – Obi-Rapu	Willett Hall; Farmville, Virginia
Regular season
November 13*; 7:00 pm, BSN		Randolph	W 69–49	1–0	22 – Obi-Rapu	20 – Lane	5 – Gee	Willett Hall (1,478); Farmville, Virginia
November 16*; 7:00 pm, BSN		La Roche	W 89–65	2–0	27 – Obi-Rapu	10 – Lane	6 – Gee	Willett Hall (1,250); Farmville, Virginia
November 20*; 8:30 pm		vs. South Carolina State @EKUHoops Classic	L 71–79	2–1	25 – Nwogbo	14 – Nwogbo	5 – Tied	Alumni Coliseum (500); Richmond, Kentucky
November 21*; 4:30 pm		vs. Ball State @EKUHoops Classic	L 67–78	2–2	21 – Obi-Rapu	9 – Lane	5 – White	Alumni Coliseum (500); Richmond, Kentucky
November 22*; 2:00 pm, OVCDN		at Eastern Kentucky @EKUHoops Classic	L 79–110	2–3	26 – Nwogbo	7 – Nwogbo	9 – Fisher	Alumni Coliseum (1,400); Richmond, Kentucky
November 25*; 2:30 pm		at Maine	L 82–92	2–4	19 – Shields	9 – Tied	3 – 3 Tied	Cross Insurance Center (2,631); Bangor, Maine
November 28*; 7:00 pm		at Columbia	W 70–69	3–4	18 – Fisher	7 – Lane	8 – Fisher	Levien Gymnasium (983); New York City
December 2; 7:00 pm, BSN		at High Point	L 66–90	3–5 (0–1)	19 – Nwogbo	10 – Nwogbo	5 – Fisher	Millis Center (1,327); High Point, North Carolina
December 5*; 5:00 pm, BSN		UMBC	L 59–70	3–6	17 – Obi-Rapu	5 – Tied	5 – Fisher	Willett Hall (1,748); Farmville, Virginia
December 12*; 6:30 pm, WTVR		at Richmond	L 59–77	3–7	17 – Obi-Rapu	11 – Johnson	6 – Johnson	Robins Center (6,493); Richmond, Virginia
December 15*; 8:00 pm, ESPNU		at Oklahoma State	L 55–73	3–8	18 – Fisher	10 – Lane	4 – Tied	Gallagher-Iba Arena (4,323); Stillwater, Oklahoma
December 19*; 8:00 pm		at George Mason	L 70–75	3–9	23 – Johnson	11 – Johnson	5 – Fisher	EagleBank Arena (3,118); Fairfax, Virginia
December 22*; 7:00 pm		at Dartmouth	L 54–78	3–10	17 – Nwogbo	11 – Nwogbo	5 – Shields	Leede Arena (512); Hanover, New Hampshire
December 28*; 7:00 pm, BSN		Cairn	W 90–52	4–10	14 – 4 Tied	12 – Johnson	5 – Johnson	Willett Hall (312); Farmville, Virginia
December 31; 2:00 pm, BSN		UNC Asheville	L 61–70	4–11 (0–2)	16 – White	8 – Johnson	6 – Johnson	Willett Hall (516); Farmville, Virginia
January 2; 2:00 pm, BSN		Gardner–Webb	L 66–67	4–12 (0–3)	19 – Johnson	11 – Nwogbo	3 – White	Willett Hall (1,028); Farmville, Virginia
January 6; 7:00 pm, BSN		at Presbyterian	L 65–78	4–13 (0–4)	16 – Lane	8 – Nwogbo	4 – Gee	Templeton Center (264); Clinton, South Carolina
January 9; 2:00 pm, BSN		Coastal Carolina	W 76–61	5–13 (1–4)	17 – Obi-Rapu	8 – Johnson	6 – Johnson	Willett Hall (1,523); Farmville, Virginia
January 14; 7:00 pm, BSN		at Campbell	W 74–57	6–13 (2–4)	19 – Nwogbo	13 – Johnson	4 – Johnson	Gore Arena (1,635); Buies Creek, North Carolina
January 19; 7:00 pm, ESPN3		at Liberty	L 53–55	6–14 (2–5)	18 – White	10 – Nwogbo	2 – Tied	Vines Center (1,828); Lynchburg, Virginia
January 24; 5:00 pm, BSN		Winthrop	L 68–82	6–15 (2–6)	20 – Obi-Rapu	10 – Lane	6 – White	Willett Hall (1,224); Farmville, Virginia
January 27; 7:00 pm, BSN		Radford	L 81–90	6–16 (2–7)	28 – White	11 – Nwogbo	3 – Tied	Willett Hall (1,598); Farmville, Virginia
January 30; 2:00 pm, ASN		at UNC Asheville	L 74–88	6–17 (2–8)	19 – Tied	9 – Lane	3 – White	Kimmel Arena (1,623); Asheville, North Carolina
February 3; 7:00 pm, BSN		Campbell	W 80–79	7–17 (3–8)	29 – White	11 – Nwogbo	5 – Johnson	Willett Hall (1,309); Farmville, Virginia
February 6; 5:30 pm, BSN		at Charleston Southern	W 78–76 ^{2OT}	8–17 (4–8)	17 – Tied	13 – Nwogbo	6 – Johnson	CSU Field House (711); North Charleston, South Carolina
February 11; 7:00 pm, BSN		at Winthrop	L 80–88	8–18 (4–9)	19 – Allen	13 – Nwogbo	6 – Johnson	Winthrop Coliseum (1,012); Rock Hill, South Carolina
February 13; 2:00 pm, BSN		Liberty	L 68–69	8–19 (4–10)	21 – Nwogbo	11 – Nwogbo	6 – Johnson	Willett Hall (1,900); Farmville, Virginia
February 18; 7:00 pm, BSN		High Point	L 80–88	8–20 (4–11)	22 – Allen	15 – Nwogbo	3 – White	Willett Hall (1,218); Farmville, Virginia
February 20; 7:00 pm, ESPN3		at Gardner–Webb	L 71–81	8–21 (4–12)	16 – Tied	11 – Nwogbo	7 – Johnson	Paul Porter Arena (1,854); Boiling Springs, North Carolina
February 25; 7:00 pm, BSN		Presbyterian	L 73–74	8–22 (4–13)	24 – Nwogbo	12 – Nwogbo	10 – Johnson	Willett Hall (1,387); Farmville, Virginia
February 27; 4:00 pm, BSN		at Radford	W 92–81	9–22 (5–13)	29 – Nwogbo	11 – Johnson	4 – 3 Tied	Dedmon Center (2,572); Radford, Virginia
Big South tournament
March 3; 2:00 pm, BSN	(8)	vs. (9) Charleston Southern; First round	W 75–69	10–22	22 – Allen	9 – Johnson	7 – Obi-Rapu	Gore Arena; Buies Creek, North Carolina
March 4; 12:00 pm, ESPN3	(8)	vs. (1) High Point; Quarterfinals	L 78–89	10–23	28 – Johnson	12 – Nwogbo	4 – Johnson	Gore Arena; Buies Creek, North Carolina
*Non-conference game. (#) Tournament seedings in parentheses. All times are in Eastern Time.
