= 2015–16 Winthrop Eagles men's basketball team =

American college basketball season

2015–16 Winthrop Eagles men's basketball
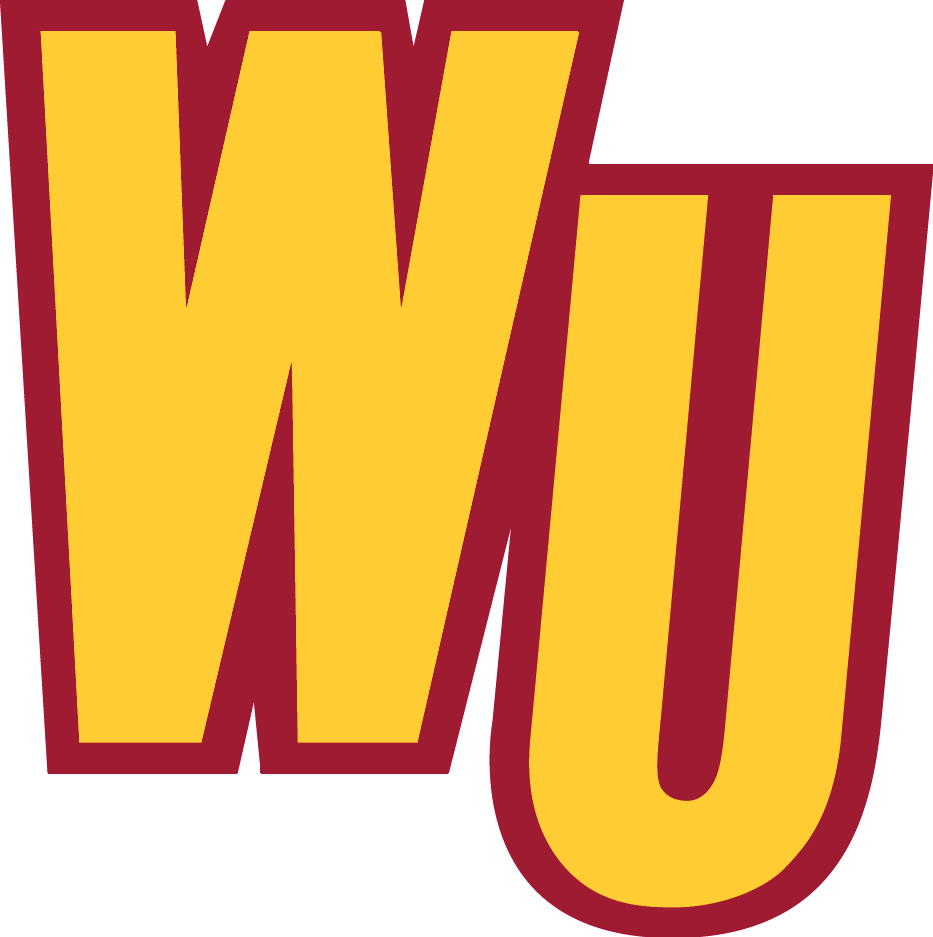

Big South regular season co–champions
- Conference: Big South Conference
- Record: 23–9 (13–5 Big South)
- Head coach: Pat Kelsey (4th season)
- Assistant coaches: Mark Prosser; Marty McGillan; Brian Kloman
- Home arena: Winthrop Coliseum

2015–16 Big South men's basketball standings
	Conf.				Overall
Team	W		L	PCT	W		L	PCT
Winthrop	13	–	5	.722	23	–	9	.719
High Point	13	–	5	.722	21	–	11	.656
UNC Asheville †	12	–	6	.667	22	–	12	.647
Coastal Carolina	12	–	6	.667	21	–	12	.636
Gardner–Webb	10	–	8	.556	17	–	16	.515
Liberty	10	–	8	.556	13	–	19	.406
Radford	9	–	9	.500	16	–	15	.516
Campbell	5	–	13	.278	12	–	18	.400
Presbyterian	5	–	13	.278	11	–	20	.355
Longwood	5	–	13	.278	10	–	23	.303
Charleston Southern	5	–	13	.278	9	–	21	.300
† 2016 Big South tournament winner

The 2015–16 Winthrop Eagles men's basketball team represented Winthrop University during the 2015–16 NCAA Division I men's basketball season. The Eagles, led by fourth year head coach Pat Kelsey, played their home games at the Winthrop Coliseum and were members of the Big South Conference. They finished the season 23–9, 13–5 in Big South play to win a share of the regular season conference championship. They defeated Presbyterian and Gardner–Webb to advance to the championship game of the Big South tournament where they lost to UNC Asheville. Despite the conference title and 23 wins, they did not participate in a postseason tournament.

== Roster ==
Number	Name	Position	Height	Weight	Year	Hometown
0	Duby Okeke	Center	6–8	230	RS–Sophomore	Jonesboro, Georgia
1	Roderick Perkins	Forward	6–5	185	RS–Junior	Smyrna, Georgia
3	Kellen Blake	Guard	6–2	165	Sophomore	Arlington, Virginia
4	Mitch Hill	Forward	6–4	200	Sophomore	Cincinnati, Ohio
5	Keon Johnson	Guard	5–7	160	Junior	Mansfield, Ohio
10	Anders Broman	Guard	6–2	190	Junior	Duluth, Minnesota
12	Xavier Cooks	Guard/Forward	6–8	185	Sophomore	Wollongong, New South Wales, Australia
13	Bjorn Broman	Guard/Forward	6–0	177	Freshman	Duluth, Minnesota
14	Adam Pickett	Guard	6–1	195	Freshman	Staunton, Virginia
25	Zach Price	Center	6–10	250	Senior	Louisville, Kentucky
31	Tevin Prescott	Forward	6–5	180	Senior	Hartsville, South Carolina
32	Freddy Poole	Forward	6–7	240	Sophomore	Columbia, South Carolina
33	Hunter Sadlon	Guard	6–0	168	Junior	Cincinnati, Ohio
35	Jarad Scott	Forward	6–8	215	Junior	Lumberton, North Carolina
42	Josh Davenport	Forward	6–5	200	Junior	Cincinnati, Ohio
44	Jimmy Gavin	Guard	6–3	195	Senior	Arlington Heights, Illinois

== Schedule ==
Date time, TV	Opponent	Result	Record	Site (attendance) city, state
Regular season
11/14/2015*; 4:00 pm	Hampton; Homecoming	W 102–95	1–0	Winthrop Coliseum (2,340); Rock Hill, SC
11/17/2015*; 7:00 pm	Truett-McConnell	W 106–78	2–0	Winthrop Coliseum (1,198); Rock Hill, SC
11/20/2015*; 7:00 pm	Jacksonville State	W 80–69	3–0	Winthrop Coliseum (1,379); Rock Hill, SC
11/24/2015*; 7:00 pm	at USC Upstate	W 79–78	4–0	Hodge Center (571); Spartanburg, SC
11/27/2015*; 7:00 pm, ESPN3	at NC State	L 79–87	4–1	PNC Arena (15,700); Raleigh, NC
12/02/2015; 7:30 pm	at Charleston Southern	W 83–82	5–1 (1–0)	CSU Field House (919); North Charleston, SC
12/05/2015; 4:00 pm	Presbyterian	W 74–70	6–1 (2–0)	Winthrop Coliseum (1,258); Rock Hill, SC
12/08/2015*; 7:00 pm, SECN	at Georgia	L 64–74	6–2	Stegeman Coliseum (4,621); Athens, GA
12/16/2015*; 9:00 pm, SECN	at Alabama	L 60–72	6–3	Coleman Coliseum (10,005); Tuscaloosa, AL
12/19/2015*; 4:00 pm	at Georgia Southern	W 88–81	7–3	Hanner Fieldhouse (807); Statesboro, GA
12/22/2015*; 12:00 pm	Alabama State	W 92–84	8–3	Winthrop Coliseum (909); Rock Hill, SC
12/28/2015*; 7:00 pm	Rio Grande	W 116–84	9–3	Winthrop Coliseum (1,079); Rock Hill, SC
12/31/2015; 4:00 pm	Campbell	L 83–90	9–4 (2–1)	Winthrop Coliseum (1,049); Rock Hill, SC
01/02/2016; 2:00 pm	at Coastal Carolina	L 63–82	9–5 (2–2)	HTC Center (1,652); Conway, SC
01/06/2016; 7:00 pm	at UNC Asheville	L 84–85	9–6 (2–3)	Kimmel Arena (1,712); Asheville, NC
01/11/2016*; 7:00 pm	Ferrum	W 81–63	10–6	Winthrop Coliseum (833); Rock Hill, SC
01/14/2016; 7:00 pm, ESPNU	High Point	W 86–66	11–6 (3–3)	Winthrop Coliseum (1,471); Rock Hill, SC
01/16/2016; 4:00 pm	Liberty	W 74–58	12–6 (4–3)	Winthrop Coliseum (1,877); Rock Hill, SC
01/20/2016; 7:00 pm	at Gardner–Webb	W 71–58	13–6 (5–3)	Paul Porter Arena (1,174); Boiling Springs, NC
01/23/2016; 5:00 pm	at Longwood	W 82–68	14–6 (6–3)	Willett Hall (1,224); Farmville, VA
01/27/2016; 7:00 pm	Charleston Southern	W 97–72	15–6 (7–3)	Winthrop Coliseum (1,198); Rock Hill, SC
01/30/2016; 4:00 pm	Radford	W 87–77	16–6 (8–3)	Winthrop Coliseum (2,143); Rock Hill, SC
02/02/2016; 7:00 pm	at Liberty	L 77–88	16–7 (8–4)	Vines Center (1,953); Lynchburg, VA
02/11/2016; 7:00 pm	Longwood	W 88–80	17–7 (9–4)	Winthrop Coliseum (1,012); Rock Hill, SC
02/13/2016; 4:00 pm	at Radford	W 86–84	18–7 (10–4)	Dedmon Center (2,012); Radford, VA
02/18/2016; 7:00 pm	Coastal Carolina	W 79–67	19–7 (11–4)	Winthrop Coliseum (2,151); Rock Hill, SC
02/20/2016; 7:00 pm	UNC Asheville	W 81–80	20–7 (12–4)	Winthrop Coliseum (1,919); Rock Hill, SC
02/25/2016; 7:00 pm, ESPNU	at High Point	L 85–87	20–8 (12–5)	Millis Athletic Center (1,750); High Point, NC
02/27/2016; 2:00 pm	at Campbell	W 87–71	21–8 (13–5)	Gore Arena (1,365); Buies Creek, NC
Big South tournament
03/04/2016; 6:00 pm, ESPN3	vs. Presbyterian; Quarterfinals	W 67–53	22–8	Gore Arena (2,035); Buies Creek, NC
03/05/2016; 3:00 pm, ESPN3	vs. Gardner–Webb; Semifinals	W 82–69	23–8	Gore Arena (2,580); Buies Creek, NC
03/06/2016; 2:30 pm, ESPN2	vs. UNC Asheville; Championship game	L 68–77	23–9	Gore Arena (2,538); Buies Creek, NC
*Non-conference game. ^{#}Rankings from AP Poll. (#) Tournament seedings in parentheses. All times are in Eastern Time.
