= 2015–16 Coastal Carolina Chanticleers men's basketball team =

American college basketball season

2015–16 Coastal Carolina Chanticleers men's basketball

CIT, Semifinals
- Conference: Big South Conference
- Record: 21–12 (12–6 Big South)
- Head coach: Cliff Ellis (9th season)
- Assistant coaches: Benny Moss; Stacey Palmore; Patrick Blake
- Home arena: HTC Center

2015–16 Big South men's basketball standings
	Conf.				Overall
Team	W		L	PCT	W		L	PCT
Winthrop	13	–	5	.722	23	–	9	.719
High Point	13	–	5	.722	21	–	11	.656
UNC Asheville †	12	–	6	.667	22	–	12	.647
Coastal Carolina	12	–	6	.667	21	–	12	.636
Gardner–Webb	10	–	8	.556	17	–	16	.515
Liberty	10	–	8	.556	13	–	19	.406
Radford	9	–	9	.500	16	–	15	.516
Campbell	5	–	13	.278	12	–	18	.400
Presbyterian	5	–	13	.278	11	–	20	.355
Longwood	5	–	13	.278	10	–	23	.303
Charleston Southern	5	–	13	.278	9	–	21	.300
† 2016 Big South tournament winner

The 2015–16 Coastal Carolina Chanticleers men's basketball team represented Coastal Carolina University during the 2015–16 NCAA Division I men's basketball season. The Chanticleers, led by ninth year head coach Cliff Ellis, played their home games at the HTC Center and are members of the Big South Conference.

== Roster ==
2015–16 Coastal Carolina Chanticleers men's basketball team
Players
Coaches

Pos.	#	Name	Height	Weight	Year	Hometown
F	1	Kevin Holmes, Jr.	6 ft 9 in (2.06 m)	190 lb (86 kg)	Fr	Virginia Beach, Virginia
G	2	Aaron Law	6 ft 0 in (1.83 m)	180 lb (82 kg)	Sr	Chapel Hill, North Carolina
G	4	Christian Adams	6 ft 3 in (1.91 m)	190 lb (86 kg)	Fr	Winston-Salem, North Carolina
G	5	Jaylen Shaw	6 ft 1 in (1.85 m)	190 lb (86 kg)	So	Hartsville, South Carolina
G	10	Shivaughn Wiggins	5 ft 11 in (1.8 m)	180 lb (82 kg)	Jr	Charlotte, North Carolina
F	12	Michel Enanga	6 ft 5 in (1.96 m)	215 lb (98 kg)	Sr	Yaoundé, Cameroon
F	21	Tristian Curtis	6 ft 7 in (2.01 m)	220 lb (100 kg)	Sr	Nassau, Bahamas
G	22	Elijah Wilson	6 ft 4 in (1.93 m)	205 lb (93 kg)	Jr	Wilmington, North Carolina
F	23	Badou Diagne	6 ft 7 in (2.01 m)	220 lb (100 kg)	Sr	Dakar, Senegal
G	30	Colton Ray-St Cyr	6 ft 5 in (1.96 m)	195 lb (88 kg)	Jr	Williamsburg, Virginia
C	32	Josh Coleman	6 ft 9 in (2.06 m)	240 lb (109 kg)	Fr	Alpharetta, Georgia
G	33	Ron Trapps	6 ft 4 in (1.93 m)	200 lb (91 kg)	RS Jr	Lancaster, South Carolina
F	35	Marcus Freeman	6 ft 8 in (2.03 m)	240 lb (109 kg)	Sr	Williamston, North Carolina

Head coach

- Cliff Ellis (Florida State)

Assistant coach(es)

- Benny Moss (Charlotte)
- Stacey Palmore (Livingstone)
- Patrick Blake (Louisville)

Legend

- (C) Team captain
- (S) Suspended
- (I) Ineligible
- (W) Walk-on
- Injured
- Current redshirt

Roster
Last update: 10-1-15

== Schedule ==
Date time, TV	Opponent	Result	Record	Site (attendance) city, state
Regular season
11/13/2015*; 10:00 pm	vs. Nevada; Rainbow Classic	L 56–73	0–1	Stan Sheriff Center (6,259); Honolulu, HI
11/15/2015*; 11:00 pm	at Hawaii; Rainbow Classic	L 63–74	0–2	Stan Sheriff Center (5,271); Honolulu, HI
11/18/2015*; 7:00 pm	Grace Bible	W 104–67	1–2	HTC Center (1,714); Conway, South Carolina
11/21/2015*; 2:00 pm	Piedmont International	W 116–35	2–2	HTC Center (1,188); Conway, South Carolina
11/24/2015*; 7:00 pm	at College of Charleston	W 67–61	3–2	TD Arena (2,367); Charleston, South Carolina
11/28/2015; 2:00 pm	at Campbell	L 73–79	3–3 (0–1)	Gore Arena (1,065); Buies Creek, North Carolina
12/02/2015*; 7:00 pm	Auburn	L 78–81	3–4	HTC Center (3,286); Conway, South Carolina
12/06/2015; 2:00 pm	Radford	W 63–58	4–4 (1–1)	HTC Center (1,487); Conway, South Carolina
12/09/2015*; 6:30 pm	North Carolina Wesleyan	W 98–73	5–4	HTC Center (1,538); Conway, South Carolina
12/14/2015*; 7:30 pm, ESPN3	at Wofford	W 71–63	6–4	Benjamin Johnson Arena (1,026); Spartanburg, South Carolina
12/18/2015*; 7:00 pm, ESPN3	at Wake Forest	L 77–83	6–5	LJVM Coliseum (8,107); Winston-Salem, North Carolina
12/20/2015*; 2:00 pm	Alabama State	W 68–65	7–5	HTC Center (1,510); Conway, South Carolina
12/31/2015; 6:00 pm	at Gardner–Webb	L 61–65	7–6 (1–2)	Paul Porter Arena (1,345); Boiling Springs, North Carolina
01/02/2016; 2:00 pm	Winthrop	W 82–63	8–6 (2–2)	HTC Center (1,652); Conway, South Carolina
01/06/2016; 7:00 pm	Liberty	L 61–62	8–7 (2–3)	HTC Center (1,630); Conway, South Carolina
01/09/2016; 2:00 pm	at Longwood	L 61–76	8–8 (2–4)	Willett Hall (1,523); Farmville, Virginia
01/14/2016; 7:00 pm	Presbyterian	W 87–58	9–8 (3–4)	HTC Center (2,117); Conway, South Carolina
01/16/2016; 7:00 pm	at High Point	W 71–68	10–8 (4–4)	Millis Athletic Center (1,750); High Point, North Carolina
01/23/2016; 5:30 pm	at Charleston Southern	W 78–63	11–8 (5–4)	CSU Field House (972); North Charleston, South Carolina
01/27/2016; 7:00 pm	UNC Asheville	W 68–66 ^{OT}	12–8 (6–4)	HTC Center (2,165); Conway, South Carolina
01/30/2016; 4:30 pm	Campbell	W 97–68	13–8 (7–4)	HTC Center (2,123); Conway, South Carolina
02/03/2016; 7:00 pm	at Presbyterian	W 69–66	14–8 (8–4)	Templeton Center (598); Clinton, South Carolina
02/06/2016; 4:00 pm	at Radford	W 72–60	15–8 (9–4)	Dedmon Center (1,487); Radford, Virginia
02/11/2016; 7:00 pm	High Point	L 67–68	15–9 (9–5)	HTC Center (2,395); Conway, South Carolina
02/13/2016; 2:00 pm	Gardner–Webb	W 78–71	16–9 (10–5)	HTC Center (2,157); Conway, South Carolina
02/18/2016; 7:00 pm	at Winthrop	L 67–79	16–10 (10–6)	Winthrop Coliseum (2,151); Rock Hill, South Carolina
02/25/2016; 7:00 pm	Charleston Southern	W 68–60	17–10 (11–6)	HTC Center (2,514); Conway, South Carolina
02/27/2016; 4:30 pm	at UNC Asheville	W 81–79	18–10 (12–6)	Kimmel Arena (3,269); Asheville, North Carolina
Big South tournament
03/04/2016; 8:00 pm, ESPN3	vs. Gardner–Webb; Quarterfinals	L 65–69	18–11	Gore Arena (2,035); Buies Creek, North Carolina
CIT
03/15/2016*; 7:00 pm	Mercer; First round	W 65–57	19–11	HTC Center (940); Conway, South Carolina
03/19/2016*; 2:00 pm	New Hampshire; Second round	W 71–62	20–11	HTC Center (847); Conway, South Carolina
03/23/2016*; 7:00 pm	Grand Canyon; Quarterfinals	W 60–58	21–11	HTC Center (1,302); Conway, South Carolina
03/27/2016*; 9:00 pm, CBSSN	UC Irvine; Semifinals	L 47–66	21–12	HTC Center (1,204); Conway, South Carolina
*Non-conference game. ^{#}Rankings from AP Poll. (#) Tournament seedings in parentheses. All times are in Eastern Time.
