= 2015–16 Liberty Flames basketball team =

American college basketball season

2015–16 Liberty Flames basketball
- Conference: Big South Conference
- Record: 13–19 (10–8 Big South)
- Head coach: Ritchie McKay (1st (3rd overall) season)
- Assistant coaches: Omar Mance (2nd season); Brad Soucie (1st (3rd) season); Kyle Getter (1st season)
- Home arena: Vines Center

2015–16 Big South men's basketball standings
	Conf.				Overall
Team	W		L	PCT	W		L	PCT
Winthrop	13	–	5	.722	23	–	9	.719
High Point	13	–	5	.722	21	–	11	.656
UNC Asheville †	12	–	6	.667	22	–	12	.647
Coastal Carolina	12	–	6	.667	21	–	12	.636
Gardner–Webb	10	–	8	.556	17	–	16	.515
Liberty	10	–	8	.556	13	–	19	.406
Radford	9	–	9	.500	16	–	15	.516
Campbell	5	–	13	.278	12	–	18	.400
Presbyterian	5	–	13	.278	11	–	20	.355
Longwood	5	–	13	.278	10	–	23	.303
Charleston Southern	5	–	13	.278	9	–	21	.300
† 2016 Big South tournament winner

The 2015–16 Liberty Flames men's basketball team represented the Liberty University in the 2015–16 NCAA Division I men's basketball season. The team played its home games in Lynchburg, Virginia for the 26th consecutive season at Vines Center, with a capacity of 8,085. The team was led by Ritchie McKay, who was in his third season, but first season since his return to the program. They were members of the Big South Conference.

They finished the season 13–19, 10–8 in Big South play to finish in a tie for fifth place. They lost in the quarterfinals of the Big South tournament to UNC Asheville.

== Departures ==
Name	Number	Pos.	Height	Weight	Year	Hometown	Notes
David Andoh	0	Forward	6'7"	220	Junior	Montreal, Quebec, Canada	Transferred to St. Bonaventure
Jordan Dembley	1	Guard	6'1"	175	Freshman	Minneapolis, Minnesota	Transferred to Williston State
Andrew Smith	11	Forward	6'9"	220	Senior	Pompano Beach, Florida	Graduated
Tomasz Gielo	12	Forward	6'9"	220	Senior	Szczecin, Poland	Transferred to Ole Miss
James Johnson	13	Forward	6'10"	245	Senior	San Diego, California	Graduated
Ethan Layer	15	Guard	6'1"	160	Junior	Forest, Virginia	Graduated
Joe Retic	23	Guard	6'3"	190	Junior	Indianapolis, Indiana	Transferred to Indianapolis
Peter Moller	31	Guard	6'3"	185	Freshman	Vaerloese, Denmark	Transferred to Metro State

== 2015–16 Newcomers ==
John Dawson, originally from Clovis, New Mexico, transferred from Marquette Golden Eagles men's basketball in January and will be eligible to play in after the 2015 fall semester.

Anthony Fields, originally from Detroit, Michigan, graduated from Bradley and will be eligible immediately. Fields started his career at Wake Forest before transferring to Bradley. He averaged 1.2 points per game last season for the Braves. Fields will be a senior.

Hansel Atencia, originally from Colombia, played his high school basketball at Mountain Mission High in Grundy, Virginia. He averaged 8.5 points, 5.2 assists, 1.7 rebounds and 1.8 steals per game during his senior year.

Lovell Cabbil, originally from Arlington, Texas, played at Mansfield Summit high school where he averaged 23 points, 4 assists, 3 rebounds and 3 steal per game his senior year.

Myo Baxter-Bell, originally from Dayton, Ohio, played at Chaminade Julienne Catholic High school where he averaged 14 points, 6 rebounds and shot 73% from the free throw line his senior year.

Caleb Homesley, originally from Indian Trail, North Carolina was the first commit of the 2015 class, originally recruited by former head coach Dale Layer.

College recruiting
Name	Hometown	School	Height	Weight	Commit date
John Dawson; G	Clovis, New Mexico	Clovis High School	6 ft 2 in (1.88 m)	205 lb (93 kg)	
John Dawson; G	Recruit ratings: Scout: Rivals: 247Sports: ESPN:				
Ryan Hiepler (W); G	Westlake Village, California	Oaks Christian High	6 ft 1 in (1.85 m)	185 lb (84 kg)	Jun 24, 2015
Ryan Hiepler (W); G	Recruit ratings: No ratings found				
Anthony Fields; G	Detroit, Michigan	Quality Education Academy (NC)	6 ft 0 in (1.83 m)	160 lb (73 kg)	Jun 5, 2015
Anthony Fields; G	Recruit ratings: No ratings found				
Hansel Atencia; G	Barrancabermeja, Colombia	Mountain Mission School	5 ft 10 in (1.78 m)	155 lb (70 kg)	Apr 28, 2015
Hansel Atencia; G	Recruit ratings: No ratings found				
Lovell Cabbil; G	Arlington, Texas	Mansfield Summit High School	6 ft 3 in (1.91 m)	155 lb (70 kg)	Apr 23, 2015
Lovell Cabbil; G	Recruit ratings: No ratings found				
Myo Baxter-Bell; F	Dayton, Ohio	Chaminade Julienne	6 ft 5 in (1.96 m)	255 lb (116 kg)	Apr 28, 2015
Myo Baxter-Bell; F	Recruit ratings: No ratings found				
Caleb Homesley; G	Indian Trail, North Carolina	Porter Ridge High School	6 ft 4 in (1.93 m)	175 lb (79 kg)	Sep 14, 2014
Caleb Homesley; G	Recruit ratings: No ratings found				
Overall recruit ranking:
Note: In many cases, Scout, Rivals, 247Sports, On3, and ESPN may conflict in their listings of height and weight.; In these cases, the average was taken. ESPN grades are on a 100-point scale.; Sources: "2015 Team Ranking". Rivals.

== Pre-season ==
=== Events ===
On March 4, 2015, hours after Liberty's loss in the first round of the Big South Conference tournament, Dale Layer was relieved as head coach of the men's basketball team. Layer spent 6 seasons as the head coach, taking over when Ritchie McKay left in 2009.

On April 1, 2015, Ritchie McKay was announced as the men's basketball coach at Liberty University. McKay spent two years as the head coach for the 2007–08 and 2008–09 seasons before leaving to join Tony Bennett at the University of Virginia. McKay served as the Associate head coach for the Cavaliers for 6 seasons before returning to Liberty.

== Roster ==
2015–16 Liberty Flames men's basketball team
Players
Coaches

Pos.	#	Name	Height	Weight	Year	Previous school	Hometown
G	0	Anthony Fields	6 ft 0 in (1.83 m)	160 lb (73 kg)	RS Sr	Quality Education Academy (NC)	Detroit, Michigan
G	1	Caleb Homesley	6 ft 4 in (1.93 m)	175 lb (79 kg)	Fr	Porter Ridge High School	Indian Trail, North Carolina
G/F	2	AC Reid	6 ft 5 in (1.96 m)	190 lb (86 kg)	So	Smithson Valley High School	Spring Branch, Texas
G	3	Calvin Hoffman (W)	6 ft 0 in (1.83 m)	165 lb (75 kg)	So	Anchorage Christian School	Anchorage, Alaska
G	4	Hansel Atencia	5 ft 10 in (1.78 m)	155 lb (70 kg)	Fr	Mountain Mission School (VA)	Colombia
G/F	5	Ryan Kemrite	6 ft 4 in (1.93 m)	200 lb (91 kg)	RS So	Satch Homeschool	Conroe, Texas
G	12	Sam Worman (W)	6 ft 3 in (1.91 m)	185 lb (84 kg)	Fr	Flint Hill School	Leesburg, Virginia
G	13	Lovell Cabbil	6 ft 3 in (1.91 m)	155 lb (70 kg)	Fr	Mansfield Summit High School	Arlington, Texas
C	15	Evan Maxwell	6 ft 10 in (2.08 m)	245 lb (111 kg)	So	Abington Heights	Clarks Summit, Pennsylvania
G	22	John Dawson	6 ft 2 in (1.88 m)	205 lb (93 kg)	RS So	Clovis High School	Clovis, New Mexico
F	24	Ezra Talbert	6 ft 8 in (2.03 m)	190 lb (86 kg)	RS Fr	Olathe East High School	Olathe, Kansas
G	44	Ryan Hiepler (W)	6 ft 0 in (1.83 m)	180 lb (82 kg)	Fr	Oaks Christian High	Westlake Village, California

Head coach

- Ritchie McKay (Seattle Pacific)

Assistant coach(es)

- Omar Mance (Rice)
- Brad Soucie (Christian Heritage)
- Kyle Getter (Hanover College)

Legend

- (C) Team captain
- (S) Suspended
- (I) Ineligible
- (W) Walk-on
- Injured
- Current redshirt

- Roster is subject to change as/if players transfer or leave the program for other reasons.
- John Dawson won't be eligible until January due to transfer rules.

== Schedule ==
Date time, TV	Opponent	Result	Record	High points	High rebounds	High assists	Site (attendance) city, state
Regular season
November 13, 2015*; 7:00 pm, LFSN	Covenant	W 64–62	1–0	15 – Maxwell	10 – Maxwell	4 – Kemrite	Vines Center (5,039); Lynchburg, VA
November 14, 2015*; 7:00 pm, LFSN	Summit	W 90–52	2–0	22 – Kemrite	7 – Maxwell	5 – Atencia	Vines Center (3,499); Lynchburg, VA
November 17, 2015*; 7:00 pm, ESPN3	William & Mary	L 59–70	2–1	13 – Fields	8 – Maxwell	3 – Fields	Vines Center (2,102); Lynchburg, VA
November 20, 2015*; 2:00 pm, LFSN	Central Penn; Challenge in Music City	W 86–50	3–1	21 – Maxwell	13 – Maxwell	6 – Fields	Vines Center (1,362); Lynchburg, VA
November 26, 2015*; 3:00 pm	vs. Appalachian State; Challenge in Music City	L 62–73	3–2	15 – Fields, Cabbil	5 – Kemrite	4 – Reid	Nashville Municipal Auditorium; Nashville, TN
November 27, 2015*; 3:00 pm	vs. Western Michigan; Challenge in Music City	L 58–68	3–3	15 – Kemrite	4 – Maxwell	6 – Fields	Nashville Municipal Auditorium; Nashville, TN
November 29, 2015*; 2:00 pm	vs. Tulane; Challenge in Music City	L 51–72	3–4	12 – Maxwell, Talbert	6 – Maxwell	5 – Cabbil	Nashville Municipal Auditorium; Nashville, TN
December 3, 2015; 7:00 pm, LFSN/ESPN3	at Radford	L 52–56	3–5 (0–1)	24 – Maxwell	12 – Maxwell	3 – Fields	Dedmon Center (2,704); Radford, VA
December 5, 2015; 2:00 pm, LFSN/ESPN3	Charleston Southern	L 61–68	3–6 (0–2)	20 – Reid	8 – Reid, Maxwell	4 – Fields	Vines Center (2,356); Lynchburg, VA
December 8, 2015*; 7:00 pm	at Furman	L 56–79	3–7	12 – Maxwell	7 – Homesley	4 – Fields	Timmons Arena (1,206); Greenville, SC
December 12, 2015*; 2:00 pm	Lamar	L 58–73	3–8	15 – Maxwell	6 – Maxwell	5 – Fields	Vines Center (1,990); Lynchburg, VA
December 17, 2015*; 7:00 pm	at Princeton	L 72–77	3–9	22 – Maxwell	8 – Maxwell	4 – Dawson	Jadwin Gymnasium (1,360); Princeton, NJ
December 20, 2015*; 4:00 pm	at St. Francis Brooklyn	L 55–64	3–10	15 – Dawson	10 – Dawson	3 – Cabbil	Generoso Pope Athletic Complex (325); Brooklyn Heights, NY
December 27, 2015*; 5:00 pm	at VCU	L 57–85	3–11	17 – Kemrite	6 – Kemrite	5 – Cabbil	Siegel Center (7,637); Richmond, VA
December 29, 2015*; 3:00 pm, ESPNU	at Notre Dame	L 56–73	3–12	18 – Homesley	8 – Maxwell, Kemrite	4 – Dawson	Edmund P. Joyce Center (8,837); Notre Dame, IN
January 2, 2016; 2:00 pm, LFSN/MASN	UNC Asheville	L 69–76	3–13 (0–3)	16 – Cabbil	10 – Homesley	5 – Fields	Vines Center (1,310); Lynchburg, VA
January 6, 2016; 7:00 pm	at Coastal Carolina	W 62–61	4–13 (1–3)	18 – Dawson	6 – Cabbil	4 – Cabbil	HTC Center (1,630); Conway, SC
January 9, 2016; 2:00 pm, ESPN3	Campbell	W 55–52	5–13 (2–3)	14 – Dawson	10 – Dawson	3 – Dawson	Vines Center (1,327); Lynchburg, VA
January 14, 2016; 7:30 pm	at Charleston Southern	L 63–64	5–14 (2–4)	17 – Homesley	7 – Dawson	6 – Dawson	CSU Field House (877); North Charleston, SC
January 16, 2016; 4:00 pm	at Winthrop	L 58–74	5–15 (2–5)	15 – Dawson	7 – Cabbil, Homesley	3 – Cabbil	Winthrop Coliseum (1,877); Rock Hill, SC
January 19, 2016; 7:00 pm, ESPN3	Longwood	W 55–53	6–15 (3–5)	14 – Dawson	9 – Dawson	5 – Cabbil, Dawson	Vines Center (1,828); Lynchburg, VA
January 23, 2016; 12:00 pm, ASN	High Point	W 69–67	7–15 (4–5)	15 – Reid	7 – Dawson	6 – Dawson	Vines Center (2,526); Lynchburg, VA
January 27, 2016; 7:00 pm	at Gardner–Webb	W 69–55	8–15 (5–5)	17 – Dawson	10 – Kemrite	6 – Cabbil	Paul Porter Arena (893); Boiling Springs, NC
January 30, 2016; 7:30 pm	at Presbyterian	W 65–61	9–15 (6–5)	19 – Dawson	6 – Kemrite	2 – 5 Different Players	Templeton Physical Education Center (1,616); Clinton, SC
February 2, 2016; 7:00 pm, ESPN3	Winthrop	W 88–77	10–15 (7–5)	20 – Maxwell, Dawson	7 – Dawson	5 – Fields, Dawson	Vines Center (1,953); Lynchburg, VA
February 6, 2016; 7:00 pm	at High Point	W 80–76	11–15 (8–5)	16 – Reid	7 – Dawson	5 – Fields	Millis Athletic Convocation Center (1,750); High Point, NC
February 13, 2016; 2:00 pm	at Longwood	W 69–68	12–15 (9–5)	20 – Reid	7 – Dawson	8 – Fields	Willett Hall (1,900); Farmville, VA
February 18, 2016; 7:00 pm, ESPN3	Radford	W 69–67	12–16 (9–6)	22 – Dawson	7 – Dawson	4 – Dawson, Fields	Vines Center (2,802); Lynchburg, VA
February 20, 2016; 7:00 pm, ESPN3	Presbyterian	W 79–73	12–17 (9–7)	18 – Reid	6 – Cabbil	8 – Dawson	Vines Center (4,323); Lynchburg, VA
February 25, 2016; 7:00 pm	at UNC Asheville	L 56–73	12–18 (9–8)	11 – Reid	5 – Maxwell	1 – Cabbil, Fields, Homesley	Kimmel Arena (1,645); Asheville, NC
February 27, 2016; 12:00 pm, ASN	Gardner–Webb	W 86–81	13–18 (10–8)	22 – Homesley	6 – Cabbil	5 – Dawson, Reid	Vines Center (2,800); Lynchburg, VA
Big South tournament
March 4, 2016; 2:00 pm, ESPN3	vs. UNC Asheville; Quarterfinals	L 49–80	13–19	15 – Dawson	4 – Homesley, Kemrite	3 – Fields	Gore Arena (1,505); Buies Creek, NC
*Non-conference game. ^{#}Rankings from AP Poll. (#) Tournament seedings in parentheses. All times are in Eastern Time..
