= 2015–16 UNC Asheville Bulldogs men's basketball team =

American college basketball season

2015–16 UNC Asheville Bulldogs men's basketball
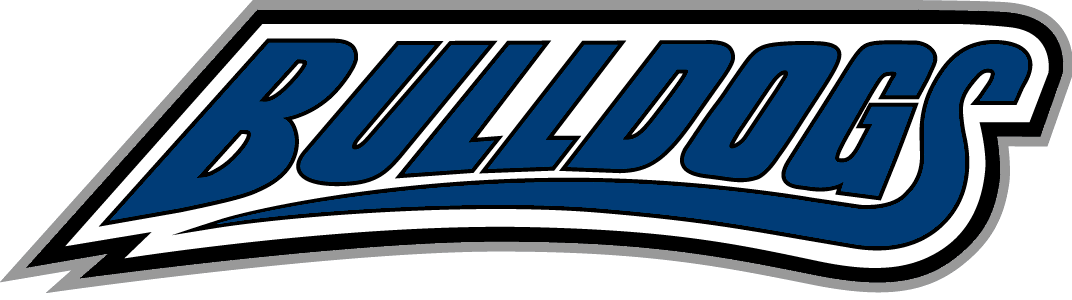

Big South tournament champions

NCAA tournament, First Round
- Conference: Big South Conference
- Record: 22–12 (12–6 Big South)
- Head coach: Nick McDevitt (3rd season)
- Assistant coaches: Brett Carey; Sean Dixon; Logan Johnson
- Home arena: Kimmel Arena

2015–16 Big South men's basketball standings
| | Conf. | | | | Overall |
| Team | W | | L | PCT | W | | L | PCT |
|---|---|---|---|---|---|---|---|---|
| Winthrop | 13 | – | 5 | .722 | 23 | – | 9 | .719 |
| High Point | 13 | – | 5 | .722 | 21 | – | 11 | .656 |
| UNC Asheville † | 12 | – | 6 | .667 | 22 | – | 12 | .647 |
| Coastal Carolina | 12 | – | 6 | .667 | 21 | – | 12 | .636 |
| Gardner–Webb | 10 | – | 8 | .556 | 17 | – | 16 | .515 |
| Liberty | 10 | – | 8 | .556 | 13 | – | 19 | .406 |
| Radford | 9 | – | 9 | .500 | 16 | – | 15 | .516 |
| Campbell | 5 | – | 13 | .278 | 12 | – | 18 | .400 |
| Presbyterian | 5 | – | 13 | .278 | 11 | – | 20 | .355 |
| Longwood | 5 | – | 13 | .278 | 10 | – | 23 | .303 |
| Charleston Southern | 5 | – | 13 | .278 | 9 | – | 21 | .300 |
† 2016 Big South tournament winner

The 2015–16 UNC Asheville Bulldogs men's basketball team represented the University of North Carolina at Asheville during the 2015–16 NCAA Division I men's basketball season. The Bulldogs, led by third year head coach Nick McDevitt, played their home games at Kimmel Arena and were members of the Big South Conference. They finished the season 22–12, 12–6 in Big South play to finish in a tie for third place. They defeated Liberty, High Point, and Winthrop to become champions Big South tournament and received the conference's automatic bid to the NCAA tournament where they were eliminated in the first round by Villanova.

== Previous season ==
The Bulldogs finished the 2014–15 season 15–16, 10–8 in Big South play to finish in sixth place. They lost to Coastal Carolina in the quarterfinals of the Big South tournament.

== Roster ==
| Number | Name | Position | Height | Weight | Year | Hometown |
|---|---|---|---|---|---|---|
| 3 | Trae Bryant | Guard | 6–1 | 180 | Freshman | Wilmington, North Carolina |
| 4 | Jack Costigan | Forward | 6–3 | 180 | Freshman | Cary, North Carolina |
| 10 | Kevin Vannatta | Guard | 6–2 | 180 | Sophomore | Columbus, Ohio |
| 11 | Isaiah White | Guard | 6–5 | 180 | Freshman | Ellicott City, Maryland |
| 12 | Raekwon Miller | Guard | 6–3 | 160 | Sophomore | Marion, North Carolina |
| 13 | David Robertson | Guard | 6–3 | 195 | Junior | Cary, North Carolina |
| 14 | Ahmad Thomas | Guard | 6–3 | 205 | Sophomore | Danville, Virginia |
| 21 | Giacomo Zilli | Forward | 6–9 | 255 | Junior | Udine, Italy |
| 22 | Dwayne Sutton | Guard | 6–5 | 195 | Freshman | Louisville, Kentucky |
| 24 | Dylan Smith | Guard | 6–5 | 170 | Freshman | Mobile, Alabama |
| 25 | Jacob Casper | Guard | 6–3 | 190 | Junior | Asheville, North Carolina |
| 31 | Sam Hughes | Forward | 6–4 | 210 | Senior | Battleboro, North Carolina |
| 32 | Will Weeks | Forward | 6–6 | 220 | Junior | Charlotte, North Carolina |
| 41 | John Cannon | Center | 6–10 | 240 | Senior | Burnsville, North Carolina |

== Schedule ==
| Date time, TV | Rank^{#} | Opponent^{#} | Result | Record | Site (attendance) city, state |
Exhibition
| 11/07/2015*; 2:00 pm | | Brevard | W 76–64 | | Kimmel Arena (906); Asheville, NC |
Regular season
| 11/13/2015*; 7:00 pm, SECN+ | | at Tennessee | L 78–82 | 0–1 | Thompson–Boling Arena (11,564); Knoxville, TN |
| 11/15/2015*; 4:30 pm | | at Western Carolina | L 81–90 | 0–2 | Ramsey Center (1,113); Cullowhee, NC |
| 11/18/2015*; 7:00 pm | | Mars Hill | W 84–51 | 1–2 | Kimmel Arena (936); Asheville, NC |
| 11/21/2015*; 4:00 pm, SECN+ | | at Texas A&M | L 47–75 | 1–3 | Reed Arena (5,557); College Station, TX |
| 11/27/2015*; 12:00 am, CBSSN | | vs. Drexel; Great Alaska Shootout quarterfinals | W 85–66 | 2–3 | Alaska Airlines Center (2,542); Anchorage, AK |
| 11/28/2015*; 12:00 am, CBSSN | | vs. Middle Tennessee; Great Alaska Shootout semifinals | L 61–63 | 2–4 | Alaska Airlines Center (2,822); Anchorage, AK |
| 11/28/2015*; 9:30 pm | | vs. Loyola–Chicago; Great Alaska Shootout 3rd place game | W 59–48 | 3–4 | Alaska Airlines Center (2,906); Anchorage, AK |
| 12/05/2015*; 4:30 pm | | Johnson & Wales–Charlotte | W 103–36 | 4–4 | Kimmel Arena (1,262); Asheville, NC |
| 12/13/2015; 2:00 pm | | Campbell | W 80–60 | 5–4 (1–0) | Kimmel Arena (1,028); Asheville, NC |
| 12/15/2015*; 7:00 pm | | East Tennessee State | W 84–64 | 6–4 | Kimmel Arena (1,327); Asheville, NC |
| 12/19/2015*; 12:00 pm, FSN | | at Georgetown | W 79–73 | 7–4 | Verizon Center (7,467); Washington, D.C. |
| 12/21/2015*; 7:00 pm | | Elon | L 81–86 | 7–5 | Kimmel Arena (1,611); Asheville, NC |
| 12/29/2015*; 7:30 pm | | Furman | W 67–65 | 8–5 | Kimmel Arena (2,073); Asheville, NC |
| 12/31/2015; 7:00 pm | | at Longwood | W 70–61 | 9–5 (2–0) | Willett Hall (516); Farmville, VA |
| 01/02/2016; 2:00 pm | | at Liberty | W 76–69 | 10–5 (3–0) | Vines Center (1,310); Lynchburg, VA |
| 01/06/2016; 7:00 pm | | Winthrop | W 85–84 | 11–5 (4–0) | Kimmel Arena (1,712); Asheville, NC |
| 01/09/2016; 5:30 pm | | at Charleston Southern | W 83–73 | 12–5 (5–0) | CSU Field House (775); North Charleston, SC |
| 01/14/2016; 7:00 pm | | at Radford | W 91–86 ^{OT} | 12-6 (5–1) | Dedmon Center (1,412); Radford, VA |
| 01/16/2016; 4:30 pm | | Gardner–Webb | W 75–69 | 13–6 (6–1) | Kimmel Arena (2,218); Asheville, NC |
| 01/20/2016; 7:00 pm | | at High Point | L 69–73 | 13–7 (6–2) | Millis Athletic Center (1,629); High Point, NC |
| 01/23/2016; 4:30 pm, ESPN3 | | Presbyterian | W 67–55 | 14–7 (7–2) | Kimmel Arena (1,034); Asheville, NC |
| 01/27/2016; 7:00 pm | | at Coastal Carolina | W 68–66 ^{OT} | 14–8 (7–3) | HTC Center (2,165); Conway, SC |
| 01/30/2016; 2:00 pm | | Longwood | W 88–74 | 15–8 (8–3) | Kimmel Arena (1,623); Asheville, NC |
| 02/03/2016; 7:00 pm | | Charleston Southern | W 63–55 | 16–8 (9–3) | Kimmel Arena (1,927); Asheville, NC |
| 02/06/2016; 4:00 pm | | at Campbell | W 81–71 | 17–8 (10–3) | Gore Arena (2,345); Buies Creek, NC |
| 02/11/2016; 9:00 pm, ESPNU | | Radford | L 59–60 | 17–9 (10–4) | Kimmel Arena (1,547); Asheville, NC |
| 02/18/2016; 7:00 pm | | at Presbyterian | W 70–61 | 18–9 (11–4) | Templeton Center (606); Clinton, SC |
| 02/20/2016; 4:00 pm | | at Winthrop | L 80–81 | 18–10 (11–5) | Winthrop Coliseum (1,919); Rock Hill, SC |
| 02/25/2016; 7:00 pm | | Liberty | W 73–56 | 19–10 (12–5) | Kimmel Arena (1,645); Asheville, NC |
| 02/27/2016; 4:30 pm, ESPN3 | | Coastal Carolina | L 79–81 | 19–11 (12–6) | Kimmel Arena (3,269); Asheville, NC |
Big South tournament
| 03/04/2016; 2:00 pm, ESPN3 | (4) | vs. (5) Liberty; Quarterfinals | W 80–49 | 20–11 | Gore Arena (1,505); Buies Creek, NC |
| 03/05/2016; 1:00 pm, ESPN3 | (4) | vs. (1) High Point; Semifinals | W 80–69 | 21–11 | Gore Arena (2,580); Buies Creek, NC |
| 03/06/2016; 2:30 pm, ESPN2 | (4) | vs. (2) Winthrop; Championship | W 77–68 | 22–11 | Gore Arena (2,538); Buies Creek, NC |
NCAA tournament
| 03/18/06*; 12:40 pm, truTV | (15 S) | vs. (2 S) No. 6 Villanova; First Round | L 56–86 | 22–12 | Barclays Center (17,333); Brooklyn, NY |
*Non-conference game. ^{#}Rankings from AP Poll. (#) Tournament seedings in parentheses. S=South Region. All times are in Eastern Time.
