= 2015–16 Campbell Fighting Camels basketball team =

American college basketball season

2015–16 Campbell Fighting Camels basketball
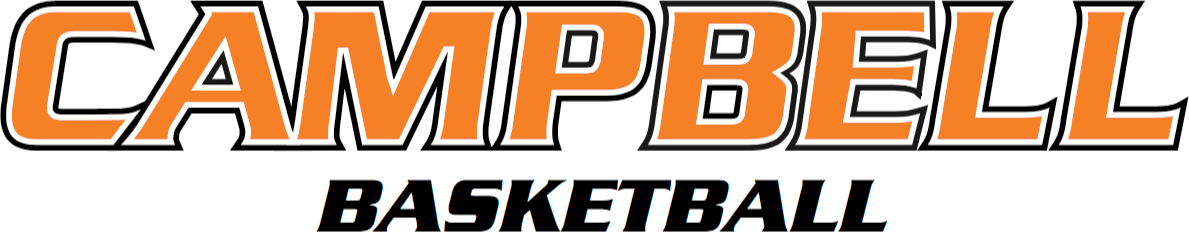
- Conference: Big South Conference
- Record: 12–18 (5–13 Big South)
- Head coach: Kevin McGeehan (3rd season)
- Assistant coaches: Peter Thomas; Mike Magpayo; Kevin Smith
- Home arena: Gore Arena

2015–16 Big South men's basketball standings
	Conf.				Overall
Team	W		L	PCT	W		L	PCT
Winthrop	13	–	5	.722	23	–	9	.719
High Point	13	–	5	.722	21	–	11	.656
UNC Asheville †	12	–	6	.667	22	–	12	.647
Coastal Carolina	12	–	6	.667	21	–	12	.636
Gardner–Webb	10	–	8	.556	17	–	16	.515
Liberty	10	–	8	.556	13	–	19	.406
Radford	9	–	9	.500	16	–	15	.516
Campbell	5	–	13	.278	12	–	18	.400
Presbyterian	5	–	13	.278	11	–	20	.355
Longwood	5	–	13	.278	10	–	23	.303
Charleston Southern	5	–	13	.278	9	–	21	.300
† 2016 Big South tournament winner

The 2015–16 Campbell Fighting Camels basketball team represented Campbell University during the 2015–16 NCAA Division I men's basketball season. The Fighting Camels were led by a third-year Kevin McGeehan and played their home games at Gore Arena. They were members of the Big South Conference. They finished the season 12–18, 5–13 in Big South play, resulting in a four-way tie for eighth place. They were eliminated in the first round of the Big South tournament to Gardner–Webb.

== Roster ==
Number	Name	Position	Height	Weight	Year	Hometown
0	Kyre' Hamer	Guard	6–2	200	Junior	Stone Mountain, Georgia
1	Chris Clemons	Guard	5–9	165	Freshman	Raleigh, North Carolina
2	Tony Allen	Guard	6–3	180	Freshman	Converse, Texas
3	Casey Perrin	Guard	5–9	170	Senior	Scottsdale, Arizona
4	Khadre Lane	Forward	6–5	200	Freshman	Lawrence, Kansas
5	Rod Days	Forward	6–6	230	Senior	Miami Gardens, Florida
12	Jon Ander Cuadra	Forward	6–8	210	Freshman	Vitoria-Gasteiz, Spain
13	Quinton Ray	Guard	6–0	195	Junior	Angier, North Carolina
15	Curtis Phillips	Forward	6–5	185	Sophomore	Memphis, Tennessee
22	D.J. Mason	Forward	6–6	220	Senior	Clarkton, North Carolina
23	Jacob Talbert	Guard	6–0	195	Junior	Southern Pines, North Carolina
25	Andrew Eudy	Forward	6–7	195	Freshman	Lebanon, Pennsylvania
32	Shane Whitfield	Forward	6–7	210	Sophomore	Raleigh, North Carolina
33	Troy Harper	Guard	6–1	165	Sophomore	Philadelphia, Pennsylvania

== Schedule ==
Date time, TV	Opponent	Result	Record	Site (attendance) city, state
Regular season
11/13/2015*; 8:15 pm	Montreat	W 87–42	1–0	Gore Arena (1,890); Buies Creek, NC
11/16/2015*; 7:00 pm	at Savannah State	L 57–59	1–1	Tiger Arena (1,420); Savannah, GA
11/21/2015*; 4:00 pm	Morgan State	L 54–59	1–2	Gore Arena (1,637); Buies Creek, NC
11/24/2015*; 8:00 pm	at SIU Edwardsville	W 77–74	2–2	Vadalabene Center (1,073); Edwardsville, IL
11/28/2015; 2:00 pm	Coastal Carolina	W 79–73	3–2 (1–0)	Gore Arena (1,065); Buies Creek, NC
11/30/2015*; 7:00 pm	VMI	W 66–65	4–2	Gore Arena (1,440); Buies Creek, NC
12/09/2015*; 7:00 pm	at Charlotte	W 76–70	5–2	Dale F. Halton Arena (3,687); Charlotte, NC
12/13/2015; 2:00 pm	at UNC Asheville	L 60–80	5–3 (1–1)	Kimmel Arena (1,028); Asheville, NC
12/16/2015*; 7:00 pm	Johnson & Wales–Charlotte	W 87–53	6–3	Gore Arena (853); Buies Creek, NC
12/19/2015*; 2:00 pm	The Citadel	W 101–82	7–3	Gore Arena (1,004); Buies Creek, NC
12/22/2015*; 2:00 pm	College of Charleston	L 68–86	7–4	Gore Arena (1,124); Buies Creek, NC
12/28/2015*; 4:00 pm	at UNC Wilmington	L 83–106	7–5	Trask Coliseum (4,396); Wilmington, NC
12/31/2015; 4:00 pm	at Wintrhop	W 90–83	8–5 (2–1)	Winthrop Coliseum (1,049); Rock Hill, SC
01/02/2016; 2:00 pm	Presbyterian	L 63–70	8–6 (2–2)	Gore Arena (1,375); Buies Creek, NC
01/06/2016; 7:00 pm	at Gardner–Webb	L 68–71	8–7 (2–3)	Paul Porter Arena (989); Boiling Springs, NC
01/09/2016; 2:00 pm	at Liberty	L 52–55	8–8 (2–4)	Vines Center (1,327); Lynchburg, VA
01/14/2016; 7:00 pm	Longwood	L 57–74	8–9 (2–5)	Gore Arena (1,635); Buies Creek, NC
01/16/2016; 4:00 pm	Charleston Southern	L 75–82	8–10 (2–6)	Gore Arena (1,715); Buies Creek, NC
01/20/2016; 7:00 pm	at Radford	L 66–78	8–11 (2–7)	Dedmon Center (1,254); Radford, VA
01/27/2016; 7:00 pm	High Point	L 63–73	8–12 (2–8)	Gore Arena (1,465); Buies Creek, NC
01/30/2016; 4:30 pm	at Coastal Carolina	L 68–97	8–13 (2–9)	HTC Center (2,123); Conway, SC
02/03/2016; 7:00 pm	at Longwood	L 79–80	8–14 (2–10)	Willett Hall (1,309); Farmville, VA
02/06/2016; 4:00 pm	UNC Asheville	L 71–81	8–15 (2–11)	Gore Arena (2,345); Buies Creek, NC
02/11/2016; 7:00 pm	Gardner–Webb	W 89–85 ^{OT}	9–15 (3–11)	Gore Arena (1,437); Buies Creek, NC
02/13/2016; 7:30 pm	at Presbyterian	W 91–61	10–15 (4–11)	Templeton Center (519); Clinton, SC
02/16/2016*; 8:00 pm	Allen	W 110–66	11–15	Gore Arena (1,135); Buies Creek, NC
02/20/2016; 5:30 pm	at Charleston Southern	W 74–72	12–15 (5–11)	CSU Field House; North Charleston, SC
02/25/2016; 7:00 pm	Radford	L 56–60	12–16 (5–12)	Gore Arena (1,284); Buies Creek, NC
02/27/2016; 4:00 pm	Winthrop	L 71–87	12–17 (5–13)	Gore Arena (1,365); Buies Creek, NC
Big South tournament
03/03/2016; 7:00 pm	Gardner–Webb; First round	L 69–79	12–18	Gore Arena (2,991); Buies Creek, NC
*Non-conference game. ^{#}Rankings from AP Poll. (#) Tournament seedings in parentheses. All times are in Eastern Time.
