= 2015–16 Radford Highlanders men's basketball team =

American college basketball season

2015–16 Radford Highlanders men's basketball
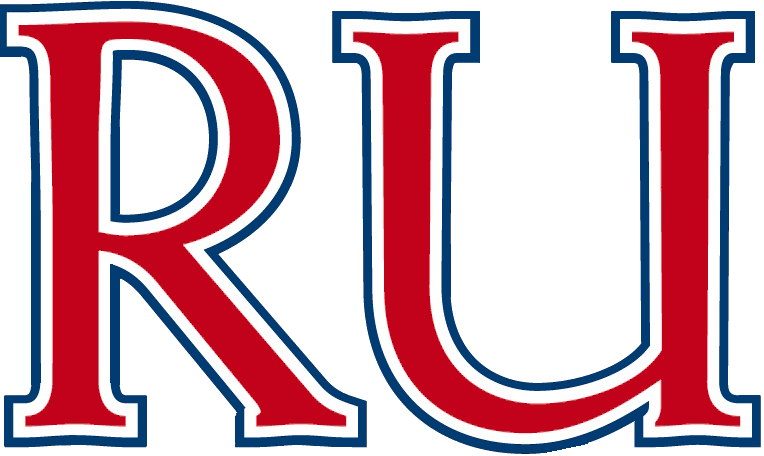
- Conference: Big South Conference
- Record: 16–15 (9–9 Big South)
- Head coach: Mike Jones (5th season)
- Assistant coaches: Chris Hawkins; Aaron Marshall; Ron Jirsa
- Home arena: Dedmon Center

2015–16 Big South men's basketball standings
	Conf.				Overall
Team	W		L	PCT	W		L	PCT
Winthrop	13	–	5	.722	23	–	9	.719
High Point	13	–	5	.722	21	–	11	.656
UNC Asheville †	12	–	6	.667	22	–	12	.647
Coastal Carolina	12	–	6	.667	21	–	12	.636
Gardner–Webb	10	–	8	.556	17	–	16	.515
Liberty	10	–	8	.556	13	–	19	.406
Radford	9	–	9	.500	16	–	15	.516
Campbell	5	–	13	.278	12	–	18	.400
Presbyterian	5	–	13	.278	11	–	20	.355
Longwood	5	–	13	.278	10	–	23	.303
Charleston Southern	5	–	13	.278	9	–	21	.300
† 2016 Big South tournament winner

The 2015–16 Radford Highlanders men's basketball team represented Radford University during the 2015–16 NCAA Division I men's basketball season. The Highlanders, led by fifth-year head coach Mike Jones, played their home games at the Dedmon Center in Radford, Virginia and were members of the Big South Conference. They finished the season 16–15, 9–9 in Big South play, to finish in seventh place. They lost to Presbyterian in the first round of the Big South tournament.

== Roster ==
Number	Name	Position	Height	Weight	Year	Hometown
00	Kion Brown	Forward	6' 7"	210	Senior	Richmond, VA
1	Taj Owens	Guard	5' 9"	160	Senior	Chesapeake, VA
3	Cameron Jones	Guard	6' 4"	180	Senior	Roanoke, VA
5	Rashaun Davis	Guard	5' 11"	185	Senior	Charlotte, NC
10	Caleb Tanner	Guard	6' 1"	170	Freshman	Floyd, VA
11	YaYa Anderson	Guard	6' 2"	195	Senior	Palmyra, VA
14	Justin Cousin	Guard	6' 0"	195	RS–Sophomore	Burlington, NC
22	Kyle Gonzalez	Guard	6' 4"	185	Senior	Springfield, VA
23	Sterling Christy	Guard	6' 6"	205	RS–Freshman	Williamsport, MD
24	Ed Polite Jr.	Forward	6' 5"	200	Freshman	Lanham, MD
25	Christian Lutete	Forward	6' 4"	190	Freshman	Silver Spring, MD
45	Darius Bolstad	Guard	6' 8"	240	Freshman	Virginia Beach, VA
55	Brandon Holcomb	Center	6' 8"	215	RS–Senior	Murrieta, CA

== Schedule ==
Date time, TV	Opponent	Result	Record	Site (attendance) city, state
Regular season
November 14, 2015*; 12:00 p.m., FS2	at Georgetown; 2K Sports Classic	W 82–80 ^{2OT}	1–0	Verizon Center (8,187); Washington, D.C.
November 16, 2015*; 7:00 p.m., CSNMA	at VCU; 2K Sports Classic	L 74–92	1–1	Siegel Center (7,637); Richmond, VA
November 18, 2015*; 7:00 p.m.	Catawba	W 68–60	2–1	Dedmon Center (2,267); Radford, VA
November 20, 2015*; 4:00 p.m.	vs. Siena; 2K Sports Classic	L 62–76	2–2	Chace Athletic Center (278); Smithfield, RI
November 21, 2015*; 4:00 p.m.	vs. Prairie View A&M; 2K Sports Classic	W 64–56	3–2	Chace Athletic Center (114); Smithfield, RI
November 24, 2015*; 6:00 p.m., BTN	at Penn State	W 86–74	4–2	Bryce Jordan Center (4,675); University Park, PA
November 30, 2015*; 7:00 p.m.	James Madison	L 68–70	4–3	Dedmon Center (3,107); Radford, VA
December 3, 2015; 7:00 p.m., MASN	Liberty	W 56–52	5–3 (1–0)	Dedmon Center (2,704); Radford, VA
December 6, 2015; 2:00 p.m.	at Coastal Carolina	L 58–63	5–4 (1–1)	HTC Center (1,487); Conway, SC
December 9, 2015*; 7:00 p.m.	Virginia Tech; Rivalry	L 65–74	5–5	Dedmon Center (4,013); Radford, VA
December 12, 2015*; 4:00 p.m.	at Howard	W 92–91 ^{2OT}	6–5	Burr Gymnasium (1,365); Washington, D.C.
December 19, 2015*; 4:00 p.m.	UNC Wilmington	W 69–67	7–5	Dedmon Center (1,064); Radford, VA
December 22, 2015*; 3:00 p.m.	at Chattanooga	L 75–77	7–6	McKenzie Arena (2,522); Chattanooga, TN
December 27, 2015*; 3:00 p.m.	Central Penn	W 123–63	8–6	Dedmon Center (1,147); Radford, VA
December 31, 2015; 7:00 p.m.	at High Point	L 60–77	8–7 (1–2)	Millis Athletic Center (1,107); High Point, NC
January 6, 2016; 7:00 p.m.	Charleston Southern	W 80–73	9–7 (2–2)	Dedmon Center (1,011); Radford, VA
January 9, 2016; 4:30 p.m.	at Gardner–Webb	L 61–83	9–8 (2–3)	Paul Porter Arena (1,363); Boiling Springs, NC
January 14, 2016; 7:00 p.m.	UNC Asheville	W 91–86 ^{OT}	10–8 (3–3)	Dedmon Center (1,412); Radford, VA
January 16, 2016; 7:00 p.m.	at Presbyterian	L 68–69	10–9 (3–4)	Templeton Center (797); Clinton, SC
January 20, 2016; 7:00 p.m.	Campbell	W 78–66	11–9 (4–4)	Dedmon Center (1,254); Radford, VA
January 24, 2016; 7:00 p.m.	Gardner–Webb	W 69–59	12–9 (5–4)	Dedmon Center (1,011); Radford, VA
January 27, 2016; 7:00 p.m.	at Longwood	W 90–81	13–9 (6–4)	Willett Hall (1,598); Farmville, VA
January 30, 2016; 4:00 p.m.	at Winthrop	L 77–87	13–10 (6–5)	Winthrop Coliseum (2,143); Rock Hill, SC
February 6, 2016; 4:00 p.m.	Coastal Carolina	L 60–72	13–11 (6–6)	Dedmon Center (1,487); Radford, VA
February 11, 2016; 7:00 p.m., ESPNU	at UNC Asheville	W 60–59	14–11 (7–6)	Kimmel Arena (1,547); Asheville, NC
February 13, 2016; 4:00 p.m., ASN	Winthrop	L 84–86	14–12 (7–7)	Dedmon Center (2,012); Radford, VA
February 18, 2016; 7:00 p.m.	at Liberty	W 69–67	15–12 (8–7)	Vines Center (2,802); Lynchburg, VA
February 20, 2016; 4:30 p.m.	High Point	L 72–75 ^{OT}	15–13 (8–8)	Dedmon Center (2,311); Radford, VA
February 25, 2016; 7:00 p.m.	at Campbell	W 60–56	16–13 (9–8)	Gore Arena (1,284); Buies Creek, NC
February 27, 2016; 4:00 p.m.	Longwood	L 81–92	16–14 (9–9)	Dedmon Center (2,572); Radford, VA
Big South tournament
March 3, 2016; 4:30 p.m.	vs. Presbyterian; First round	L 64–65	16–15	Gore Arena (2,991); Buies Creek, NC
*Non-conference game. ^{#}Rankings from AP poll. (#) Tournament seedings in parentheses. All times are in Eastern.
