= Nick McDevitt =

American basketball coach (born 1979)

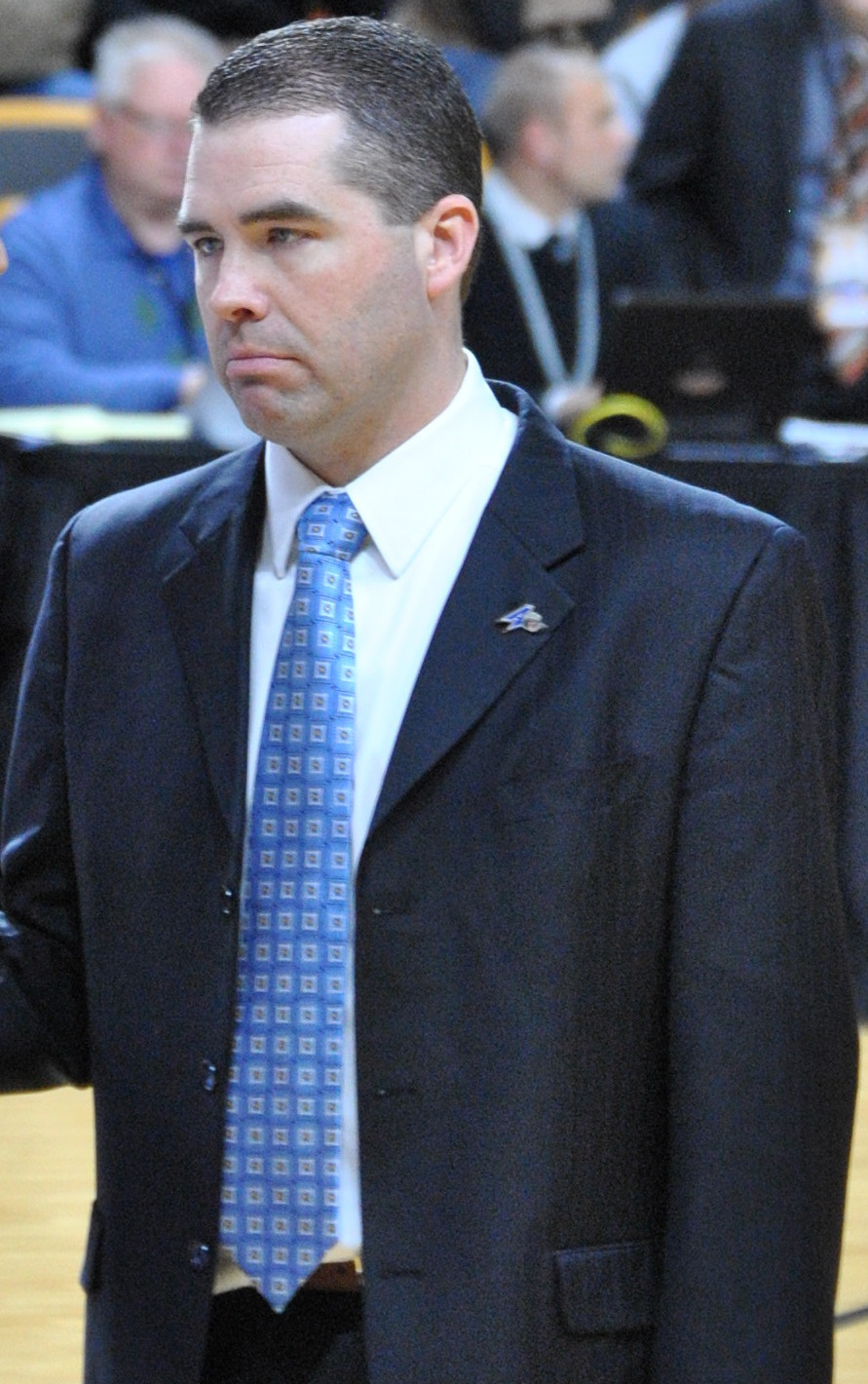

Current position
- Title: Head coach
- Team: Middle Tennessee
- Conference: Conference USA
- Record: 122–133 (.478)

Biographical details
- Born: April 21, 1979 (age 47); Marshall, North Carolina, U.S.

Playing career
- 1997–2001: UNC Asheville
- Position: Guard

Coaching career (HC unless noted)
- 2001–2011: UNC Asheville (asst.)
- 2011–2013: UNC Asheville (assoc. HC)
- 2013–2018: UNC Asheville
- 2018–present: Middle Tennessee

Head coaching record
- Overall: 220–199 (.525)
- Tournaments: 0–1 (NCAA Division I); 0–2 (NIT); 3–1 (CBI); 0–1 (CIT)

Accomplishments and honors

Championships
- Big South tournament (2016); 2 Big South regular season (2017, 2018); C-USA East division (2022)

Awards
- Big South Coach of the Year (2017); C-USA Coach of the Year (2022)

Nicholas Bryan McDevitt (born April 21, 1979) is a college basketball coach and the current head coach for Middle Tennessee State University (MTSU). McDevitt came to MTSU from his alma mater, UNC Asheville, where he compiled a 98–66 record and led the Bulldogs to consecutive Big South Conference regular season titles in 2017 and 2018.

== Head coaching record ==
Record table
Season	Team	Overall	Conference	Standing	Postseason
UNC Asheville Bulldogs (Big South Conference) (2013–2018)
2013–14	UNC Asheville	17–15	10–6	T–2nd (South)	
2014–15	UNC Asheville	15–16	10–8	T–6th	
2015–16	UNC Asheville	22–12	12–6	T–3rd	NCAA Division I Round of 64
2016–17	UNC Asheville	23–10	15–3	T–1st	CIT first round
2017–18	UNC Asheville	21–13	13–5	1st	NIT first round
UNC Asheville:		98–66 (.598)	60–28 (.682)		
Middle Tennessee Blue Raiders (Conference USA) (2018–present)
2018–19	Middle Tennessee	11–21	8–10	T–9th	
2019–20	Middle Tennessee	8–23	4–14	14th	
2020–21	Middle Tennessee	5–18	3–13	6th (East)	
2021–22	Middle Tennessee	26–11	13–5	1st (East)	CBI Runner-Up
2022–23	Middle Tennessee	19–14	11–9	4th	
2023–24	Middle Tennessee	14–19	7–9	T–4th	
2024–25	Middle Tennessee	22–12	12–6	T–2nd	NIT First Round
2025–26	Middle Tennessee	17–15	11–9	T–3rd	
2026–27	Middle Tennessee	0–0	0–0		
Middle Tennessee:		122–133 (.478)	69–75 (.479)		
Total:		220–199 (.525)			
National champion Postseason invitational champion Conference regular season champion Conference regular season and conference tournament champion Division regular season champion Division regular season and conference tournament champion Conference tournament champion
