= 2016 Big South Conference men's basketball tournament =

- Classification: Division I
- Season: 2015–16
- Teams: 11
- Site: Campbell University; Pope Convocation Center; Buies Creek, North Carolina
- Champions: UNC Asheville (5th title)
- Winning coach: Nick McDevitt (1st title)
- MVP: Dwayne Sutton (UNC Asheville)

2015–16 Big South men's basketball standings
	Conf.				Overall
Team	W		L	PCT	W		L	PCT
Winthrop	13	–	5	.722	23	–	9	.719
High Point	13	–	5	.722	21	–	11	.656
UNC Asheville †	12	–	6	.667	22	–	12	.647
Coastal Carolina	12	–	6	.667	21	–	12	.636
Gardner–Webb	10	–	8	.556	17	–	16	.515
Liberty	10	–	8	.556	13	–	19	.406
Radford	9	–	9	.500	16	–	15	.516
Campbell	5	–	13	.278	12	–	18	.400
Presbyterian	5	–	13	.278	11	–	20	.355
Longwood	5	–	13	.278	10	–	23	.303
Charleston Southern	5	–	13	.278	9	–	21	.300
† 2016 Big South tournament winner

The 2016 Big South men's basketball tournament was held from March 3–6, 2016, at the Pope Convocation Center in Buies Creek, North Carolina on the campus of Campbell University. UNC Asheville won the tournament and received the Big South's automatic bid to the 2016 NCAA tournament.

== Site ==
Coastal Carolina was originally scheduled to host the basketball tournament for a fourth consecutive year, but, on August 30, 2015, the school announced that they would be joining the Sun Belt Conference effective July 1, 2016. Big South bylaws state that member schools leaving the conference with less than two years notice are not eligible to host championships.

== Seeds ==
All 11 conference teams were eligible for the tournament. The top five teams received a first round bye. Teams were seeded by record within the conference, with a tiebreaker system to seed teams with identical conference records.

Seed	School	Conference	Overall	Tiebreaker
1	High Point	13–5	20–9	1–1 vs. Winthrop, 1–1 vs. Coastal Carolina, 1–0 vs. UNC Asheville
2	Winthrop	13–5	21–8	1–1 vs. High Point, 1–1 vs. Coastal Carolina, 1–1 vs. UNC Asheville
3	Coastal Carolina	12–6	18–10	2–0 vs. UNC Asheville
4	UNC Asheville	12–6	19–11	0–2 vs. Coastal Carolina
5	Liberty	10–8	13–18	2–0 vs. Gardner–Webb
6	Gardner–Webb	10–8	15–15	0–2 vs. Liberty
7	Radford	9–9	16–14	
8	Longwood	5–13	9–22	1–0 vs. Charleston Southern, 0–2 vs. Presbyterian, 2–0 vs. Campbell
9	Charleston Southern	5–13	9–20	0–1 vs. Longwood, 1–1 vs. Campbell, 2–0 vs. Presbyterian
10	Presbyterian	5–13	10–19	1–1 vs. Campbell, 2–0 vs. Longwood, 0–2 vs. Charleston Southern
11	Campbell	5–13	12–17	1–1 vs. Presbyterian, 1–1 vs. Charleston Southern, 0–2 vs. Longwood
‡ – Big South regular season champions. † – Received a bye in the conference tournament. Overall records are as of the end of the regular season.

== Schedule ==
Session	Game	Time*	Matchup^{#}	Television	Score
First round - Thursday, March 3
1	1	2:00 pm	#8 Longwood vs. #9 Charleston Southern	BSN	75–69
1	2	4:30 pm	#7 Radford vs. #10 Presbyterian	BSN	64–65
1	3	7:00 pm	#6 Gardner–Webb vs. #11 Campbell	BSN	79–69
Quarterfinals - Friday, March 4
2	4	12:00 pm	#1 High Point vs. #8 Longwood	ESPN3	89–78
2	5	2:00 pm	#4 UNC Asheville vs. #5 Liberty	ESPN3	80–49
3	6	6:00 pm	#2 Winthrop vs. #10 Presbyterian	ESPN3	67–53
3	7	8:00 pm	#3 Coastal Carolina vs. #6 Gardner–Webb	ESPN3	65–69
Semifinals - Saturday, March 5
4	8	1:00 pm	#1 High Point vs. #4 UNC Asheville	ESPN3	69–80
4	9	3:00 pm	#2 Winthrop vs. #6 Gardner–Webb	ESPN3	89–62
Championship - Sunday, March 6
5	10	2:30 pm	#2 Winthrop vs. #4 UNC Asheville	ESPN2	68–77
*Game times in ET. #-Rankings denote tournament seeding.

== Bracket ==
First round Thursday, March 3
8	Longwood	75
9	Charleston Southern	69
7	Radford	64
10	Presbyterian	65
6	Gardner–Webb	79
11	Campbell	69

Quarterfinals; Friday, March 4
1	High Point	89
8	Longwood	78
4	UNC Asheville	80
5	Liberty	49
2	Winthrop	67
10	Presbyterian	53
3	Coastal Carolina	65
6	Gardner–Webb	69

Semifinals; Saturday, March 5
1	High Point	69
4	UNC Asheville	80
2	Winthrop	82
6	Gardner–Webb	69

Championship; Sunday, March 6
4	UNC Asheville	77
2	Winthrop	68
