= 2015–16 VCU Rams men's basketball team =

American college basketball season

2015–16 VCU Rams men's basketball

Atlantic 10 regular season co-champions

NCAA tournament, Second Round
- Conference: Atlantic 10 Conference
- Record: 25–11 (14–4 A-10)
- Head coach: Will Wade (1st season)
- Assistant coaches: Rasheen Davis (1st year); Wes Long (1st year); Jamil Jones (1st year)
- Home arena: Stuart C. Siegel Center

2015–16 Atlantic 10 men's basketball standings
	Conf.				Overall
Team	W		L	PCT	W		L	PCT
Dayton	14	–	4	.778	25	–	8	.758
VCU	14	–	4	.778	25	–	11	.694
St. Bonaventure	14	–	4	.778	22	–	9	.710
Saint Joseph's †	13	–	5	.722	28	–	8	.778
George Washington	11	–	7	.611	28	–	10	.737
Davidson	10	–	8	.556	20	–	13	.606
Rhode Island	9	–	9	.500	17	–	15	.531
Fordham	8	–	10	.444	17	–	14	.548
Richmond	7	–	11	.389	16	–	16	.500
UMass	6	–	12	.333	14	–	18	.438
Duquesne	6	–	12	.333	17	–	17	.500
George Mason	5	–	13	.278	11	–	21	.344
Saint Louis	5	–	13	.278	11	–	21	.344
La Salle	4	–	14	.222	9	–	22	.290
† 2016 A10 Tournament winner

The 2015–16 VCU Rams men's basketball team represented Virginia Commonwealth University during the 2015–16 NCAA Division I men's basketball season. It was the 48th season of the University fielding a men's basketball program. The program was led by Will Wade, who was leading the program for his first season after previously coaching Chattanooga. Wade replaced former head coach, Shaka Smart, who resigned from VCU for the vacancy at Texas.

Led by a core of rising juniors and seniors, including Mo Alie-Cox and Melvin Johnson, the Rams finished the season 25–11, 14–4 in A-10 play to finish tied for the A-10 conference championship. They defeated Massachusetts and Davidson to advance to the championship game of the A-10 tournament where they lost to Saint Joseph's. The Rams receive an at-large bid to the NCAA tournament, making it their sixth-consecutive NCAA Tournament bid. The Rams were a #10 seed in the West Region. They defeated #7 seed Oregon State in the First Round before losing to Oklahoma in the Second Round.

== Previous season ==
The Rams finished the 2014–15 season with a record of 26–10, 12–6 in A-10 play to finish tied for third-place. In the A-10 tournament, the Rams won their first conference tournament championship since 2012 (while members of the Colonial Athletic Association), and their first A-10 title, defeating Dayton in the championship game. The Rams received the conference's automatic bid to the NCAA tournament where they lost in the Second Round to Ohio State.

== Offseason ==
=== Departures ===
Name	Number	Pos.	Height	Weight	Year	Hometown	Notes
Brianté Weber	2	G	6'2"	165	Senior	Chesapeake, VA	Graduated
Treveon Graham	21	F/G	6'6"	220	Senior	Washington, DC	Graduated
Terry Larrier	22	F	6'8"	175	Freshman	Bronx, NY	Transferred to Connecticut
Jarred Guest	23	F	6'8"	225	Senior	Columbia, SC	Graduated
Antravious Simmons	25	F	6'9"	250	RS Freshman	Miami, FL	Transferred to Florida Gulf Coast

=== Incoming transfers ===
Name	Number	Pos.	Height	Weight	Year	Hometown	Previous School
Ahmed Mohamed	23	F	6'9"	245	Junior	Alexandria, Egypt	Junior college transferred from Lee College
Korey Billbury	24	G	6'3"	200	RS Senior	Tulsa, OK	Transferred from Oral Roberts. Will be eligible to play immediately since Billbury graduated from Oral Roberts.

=== 2015 recruiting class ===
College recruiting information
Name	Hometown	School	Height	Weight	Commit date
Jonathan Nwankwo; PF	Mount Vernon, NY	Victory Rock Prep	6 ft 10 in (2.08 m)	240 lb (110 kg)	Jun 5, 2015
Jonathan Nwankwo; PF	Recruit ratings: Scout: Rivals: (80)				
Samir Doughty; SG	Philadelphia, PA	Math, Civics and Sciences Charter School	6 ft 3 in (1.91 m)	180 lb (82 kg)	Jun 4, 2015
Samir Doughty; SG	Recruit ratings: Scout: Rivals: (76)				
Gerron Scissum; SF	Huntsville, AL	Lee High School	6 ft 7 in (2.01 m)	190 lb (86 kg)	Apr 21, 2015
Gerron Scissum; SF	Recruit ratings: Scout: Rivals: (0)				
Overall recruit ranking:
Note: In many cases, Scout, Rivals, 247Sports, On3, and ESPN may conflict in their listings of height and weight.; In these cases, the average was taken. ESPN grades are on a 100-point scale.; Sources: "2015 Team Ranking". Rivals.

== Roster ==
2015–16 VCU Rams men's basketball team
Players
Coaches

Pos.	#	Name	Height	Weight	Year	Hometown
G	1	JeQuan Lewis	6 ft 1 in (1.85 m)	180 lb (82 kg)	Jr	Dickson, TN
G	2	Samir Doughty	6 ft 4 in (1.93 m)	175 lb (79 kg)	Fr	Philadelphia, PA
G	3	Jordan Riullano (W)	5 ft 9 in (1.75 m)	185 lb (84 kg)	Fr	Bronx, NY
F	4	Justin Tillman	6 ft 7 in (2.01 m)	215 lb (98 kg)	So	Redford, MI
G	5	Doug Brooks	6 ft 4 in (1.93 m)	195 lb (88 kg)	Jr	Lake Wales, FL
G	10	Jonathan Williams	6 ft 1 in (1.85 m)	185 lb (84 kg)	So	Newark, NJ
F	11	Michael Gilmore	6 ft 10 in (2.08 m)	215 lb (98 kg)	So	Tallahassee, FL
F	12	Mo Alie-Cox	6 ft 7 in (2.01 m)	250 lb (113 kg)	RS Jr	Middleburg, VA
G	14	Torey Burston (W)	5 ft 8 in (1.73 m)	180 lb (82 kg)	RS Jr	Richmond, VA
G	20	Jordan Burgess	6 ft 5 in (1.96 m)	225 lb (102 kg)	RS Jr	Midlothian, VA
F	22	Gerron Scissum	6 ft 7 in (2.01 m)	210 lb (95 kg)	Fr	Huntsville, AL
F	23	Ahamad Hamdy Mohamed	6 ft 9 in (2.06 m)	230 lb (104 kg)	Jr	Alexandria, Egypt
G	24	Korey Billbury	6 ft 4 in (1.93 m)	210 lb (95 kg)	RS Sr	Tulsa, OK
G	32	Melvin Johnson	6 ft 4 in (1.93 m)	190 lb (86 kg)	Sr	Bronx, NY
F	33	Johnathan Nwankwo	6 ft 9 in (2.06 m)	245 lb (111 kg)	Fr	Bronx, NY

Head coach

- Will Wade (Clemson)

Assistant coach(es)

- Rasheen Davis (St. Thomas Aquinas)
- Wes Long (Clemson)
- Jamil Jones (Arkansas Tech)

Legend

- (C) Team captain
- (S) Suspended
- (I) Ineligible
- (W) Walk-on
- Injured
- Current redshirt

Roster

== Schedule ==
Date time, TV	Rank^{#}	Opponent^{#}	Result	Record	High points	High rebounds	High assists	Site (attendance) city, state
Exhibition
November 6, 2015*; 7:00 pm		California (PA)	W 96–60		21 – Johnson	11 – Billbury	7 – Lewis	Siegel Center (7,637); Richmond, VA
Non-conference regular season
November 13, 2015*; 7:00 pm, WTVR 6.3		Prairie View A&M; 2K Sports Classic	W 75–50	1–0	13 – Tied	11 – Tillman	7 – Lewis	Siegel Center (7,637); Richmond, VA
November 16, 2015*; 7:00 pm, CSNMA		Radford; 2K Sports Classic	W 92–74	2–0	24 – Johnson	8 – Alie-Cox	8 – Lewis	Siegel Center (7,637); Richmond, VA
November 20, 2015*; 7:30 pm, ESPN2		vs. No. 5 Duke; 2K Sports Classic semifinals	L 71–79	2–1	20 – Johnson	8 – Tillman	6 – Lewis	Madison Square Garden (18,238); New York City, NY
November 22, 2015*; 3:30 pm, ESPN2		vs. Wisconsin; 2K Sports Classic	L 73–74	2–2	21 – Johnson	8 – Mohamed	3 – Burgess	Madison Square Garden (17,287); New York City, NY
November 25, 2015*; 7:00 pm		American	W 72–44	3–2	13 – Johnson	14 – Tillman	3 – Tied	Siegel Center (7,637); Richmond, VA
November 28, 2015*; 4:00 pm, CSNMA		Old Dominion; Rivalry	W 76–67	4–2	16 – Lewis	6 – Hamdy-Mohamed	3 – Tied	Siegel Center (7,637); Richmond, VA
December 2, 2015*; 8:00 pm, FSN		at Middle Tennessee	W 62–56	5–2	19 – Johnson	7 – Tied	5 – Johnson	Murphy Center (8,882); Murfreesboro, TN
December 6, 2015*; 2:00 pm, ESPNU		vs. Florida State; Philips Arena Showcase	L 71–76	5–3	36 – Johnson	7 – Gilmore	4 – Lewis	Philips Arena (1,789); Atlanta, GA
December 15, 2015*; 9:00 pm, ESPN2		at Georgia Tech	L 64–77	5–4	18 – Tillman	7 – Alie-Cox	4 – Lewis	McCamish Pavilion (5,219); Atlanta, GA
December 19, 2015*; 4:00 pm, CBSSN		No. 23 Cincinnati	L 63–69	5–5	22 – Billbury	9 – Billbury	4 – Lewis	Siegel Center (7,637); Richmond, VA
December 22, 2015*; 7:00 pm, CSNMA		Buffalo	W 90–69	6–5	22 – Johnson	6 – Billbury	4 – Williams	Siegel Center (7,637); Richmond, VA
December 27, 2015*; 5:00 pm, WTVR		Liberty	W 85–57	7–5	15 – Johnson	11 – Tillman	3 – 3 tied	Siegel Center; Richmond, VA
December 30, 2015*; 7:00 pm, WTVR		North Florida	W 80–68	8–5	23 – Johnson	9 – Burgess	10 – Lewis	Siegel Center (7,637); Richmond, VA
Atlantic 10 regular season
January 3, 2016; 5:00 pm, CBSSN		George Mason; Rivalry	W 71–47	9–5 (1–0)	22 – Johnson	8 – Tied	6 – Lewis	Siegel Center (7,637); Richmond, VA
January 5, 2016; 7:00 pm, ASN		at Saint Joseph's	W 85–82	10–5 (2–0)	25 – Johnson	8 – Billbury	6 – Lewis	Hagan Arena (3,752); Philadelphia, PA
January 10, 2016; 4:00 pm, NBCSN		at Saint Louis	W 72–56	11–5 (3–0)	16 – Alie-Cox	5 – Johnson	4 – Tied	Chaifetz Arena (8,719); St. Louis, MO
January 13, 2016; 7:00 pm, ASN		Fordham	W 88–54	12–5 (4–0)	27 – Tillman	10 – Tillman	7 – Lewis	Siegel Center (7,637); Richmond, VA
January 16, 2016; 2:00 pm, CBSSN		at Richmond; Capital City Classic	W 94–89 ^{OT}	13–5 (5–0)	29 – Lewis	11 – Tillman	6 – Johnson	Robins Center (7,201); Richmond, VA
January 20, 2016; 7:00 pm, MASN		Duquesne	W 93–71	14–5 (6–0)	16 – Tied	8 – Lewis	4 – Brooks	Siegel Center (7,637); Richmond, VA
January 23, 2016; 2:30 pm, NBCSN		St. Bonaventure	W 84–76	15–5 (7–0)	26 – Lewis	8 – Tied	7 – Lewis	Siegel Center (7,637); Richmond, VA
January 29, 2016; 6:00 pm, ESPN2		at Davidson	W 79–69	16–5 (8–0)	22 – Lewis	11 – Alie-Cox	5 – Lewis	John M. Belk Arena (5,295); Davidson, NC
February 3, 2016; 7:00 pm		at La Salle	W 88–70	17–5 (9–0)	30 – Johnson	7 – Billbury	3 – Allie-Cox	Tom Gola Arena (1,711); Philadelphia, PA
February 6, 2016; 12:00 pm, CBSSN		George Washington	L 69–71	17–6 (9–1)	16 – Lewis	9 – Billbury	5 – Lewis	Siegel Center (7,637); Richmond, VA
February 11, 2016; 7:00 pm, ESPNU		at Massachusetts	L 63–69	17–7 (9–2)	15 – Tied	4 – Tied	5 – Lewis	Mullins Center (2,698); Amherst, MA
February 13, 2016; 6:00 pm, CBSSN		Saint Louis	W 85–52	18–7 (10–2)	20 – Billbury	11 – Tillman	7 – Williams	Siegel Center (7,637); Richmond, VA
February 16, 2016; 7:30 pm, CBSSN		Rhode Island	W 83–67	19–7 (11–2)	21 – Alie-Cox	6 – Billbury	6 – Lewis	Siegel Center (7,637); Richmond, VA
February 19, 2016; 7:00 pm, ESPN2		Richmond; Capital City Classic	W 87–74	20–7 (12–2)	22 – Johnson	12 – Alie-Cox	10 – Lewis	Siegel Center (7,637); Richmond, VA
February 24, 2016; 7:00 pm		at George Mason; Rivalry	L 69–76	20–8 (12–3)	24 – Johnson	13 – Tillman	4 – Johnson	EagleBank Arena (5,138); Fairfax, VA
February 27, 2016; 12:30 pm, NBCSN		at George Washington	W 69–65	21–8 (13–3)	17 – Williams	7 – Alie-Cox	5 – Williams	Charles E. Smith Center (4,385); Washington, D.C.
March 2, 2016; 7:00 pm, CBSSN		Davidson	W 70–60	22–8 (14–3)	18 – Alie-Cox	9 – Alie-Cox	8 – Lewis	Siegel Center (7,637); Richmond, VA
March 5, 2016; 8:00 pm, CBSSN		at Dayton	L 67–68 ^{OT}	22–9 (14–4)	16 – Billbury	21 – Tillman	3 – Williams	UD Arena (13,455); Dayton, OH
Atlantic 10 Tournament
March 11, 2016; 6:30 pm, NBCSN	(2)	vs. (10) Massachusetts; Quarterfinals	W 85–70	23–9	19 – Johnson	9 – Tillman	3 – Tied	Barclays Center (8,223); Brooklyn, NY
March 12, 2016; 4:00 pm, CBSSN	(2)	vs. (6) Davidson; Semifinals	W 76–54	24–9	17 – Billbury	7 – Billbury	3 – Tied	Barclays Center (10,439); Brooklyn, NY
March 13, 2016; 12:00 pm, CBS	(2)	vs. (4) St. Joseph's; Championship	L 74–87	24–10	19 – Tied	8 – Tillman	7 – Lewis	Barclays Center (8,413); Brooklyn, NY
NCAA tournament
March 18, 2016*; 1:30 pm, TNT	(10 W)	vs. (7 W) Oregon State; First Round	W 75–67	25–10	21 – Lewis	8 – Alie-Cox	8 – Lewis	Chesapeake Energy Arena (15,662); Oklahoma City, OK
March 20, 2016*; 5:30 pm, CBS	(10 W)	vs. (2 W) No. 7 Oklahoma; Second Round	L 81–85	25–11	23 – Johnson	9 – Burgess	9 – Lewis	Chesapeake Energy Arena (15,279); Oklahoma City, OK
*Non-conference game. ^{#}Rankings from AP poll. (#) Tournament seedings in parentheses. W=West Region. All times are in Eastern Time.
