= Buccaneer Field House =

Arena at Charleston Southern University

- Buc Dome
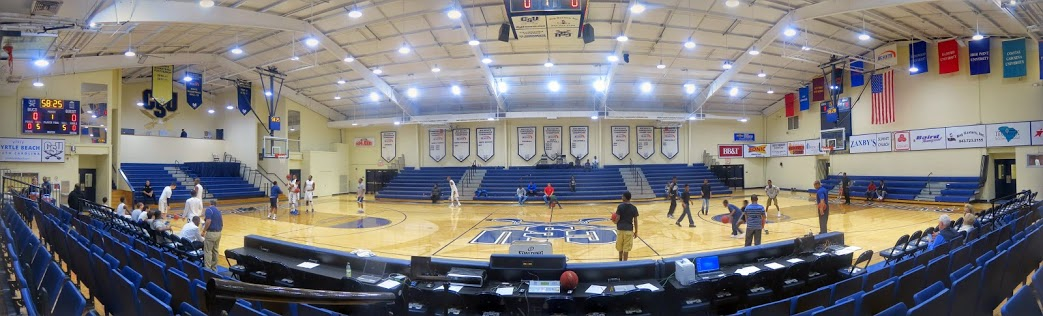
- Interactive map of Buccaneer Field House
- Location: 9200 University Boulevard; North Charleston, SC 29406
- Coordinates: 32°58′50.96″N 80°04′01.65″W
- Owner: Charleston Southern University
- Operator: Charleston Southern University
- Capacity: 881

Construction
- Groundbreaking: 1964
- Opened: 1965

Tenants
- Charleston Southern men's and women's basketball Charleston Southern University women's volleyball

Buccaneer Field House is an 881-seat multi-purpose arena in North Charleston, South Carolina. Called by many the Buc Dome, it is home to the Charleston Southern Buccaneers basketball teams. It is the second smallest arena in Division I basketball after the G. B. Hodge Center, and is one of two arenas used by the Buccaneers.

For home games involving major conference teams or local opponents such as The Citadel or the College of Charleston, the team will play home games in the North Charleston Coliseum pending availability from South Carolina Stingrays hockey games.

== See also ==
- List of NCAA Division I basketball arenas
