= Millis Athletic Convocation Center =

Multi-purpose athletic and academic facility in High Point, North Carolina

Millis Athletic/Convocation Center

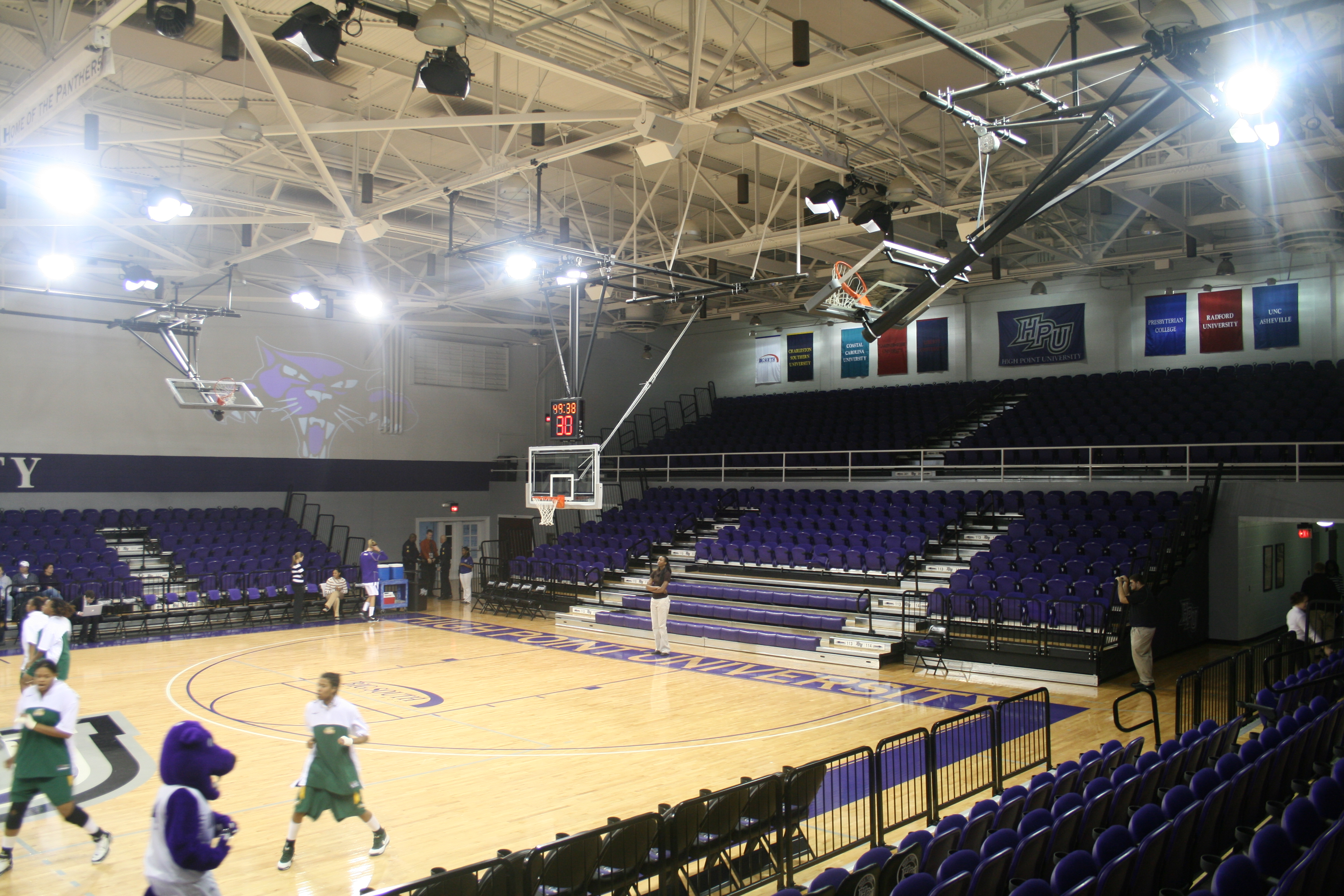
- The arena in 2008
- Interactive map of Millis Athletic/Convocation Center
- Location: 922 West College Drive; High Point, NC 27262
- Coordinates: 35°58′24.44″N 79°59′44.54″W
- Owner: High Point University
- Operator: HPU Athletics
- Capacity: 1,750
- Surface: Hardwood
- Current use: Basketball; Volleyball

Construction
- Groundbreaking: 1990
- Opened: 1992; 34 years ago
- Cost: $6.7 million ($15.4 million in 2025 dollars)

Tenants
- High Point Panthers teams: men's and women's basketball; volleyball

Website
- highpointpanthers.com/millis-center

The James H. and Jesse E. Millis Athletic and Convocation Center is a 1750-seat multi-purpose athletic and academic facility on the campus of High Point University (HPU) in High Point, North Carolina. The basis of the building is Alumni Hall, it is home to the high point university panthers men’s basketball which was built in 1957. In 1992, the facility was added upon, creating the office space, classrooms and pool on the western side of the facility, as well as adding a state-of-the-art press box.

In recent years the massive expansion of HPU has not left Millis unnoticed. A "jumbotron," an LED-powered scorers table and a four-sided scoreboard were added in the last couple years. On October 24, 2007 (prior to the 2007-08 basketball season) two more "jumbotrons" were installed.

Much of the previous strain for space in the Millis Center has been alleviated by the recent opening of the Jerry and Kitty Steele Center.

Millis Center has hosted several notable events, such as President George W. Bush's televised 2002 speech, HPU Presidential Scholarship Weekend events, HPU men's and women's basketball games, HPU volleyball matches, and other ancillary HPU events.

In January 2017, High Point University announced that the men's and women's basketball programs would be moving to a new arena near the corner of University Parkway and Lexington Avenue, just north of Vert Stadium, with a planned completion date of October 2020. However, due to construction delays brought on by COVID-19, the university announced in August 2020 that the new arena would not open until the 2021–22 school year.

== See also ==
- List of NCAA Division I basketball arenas
