= Paul Porter Arena =

American university sports arena

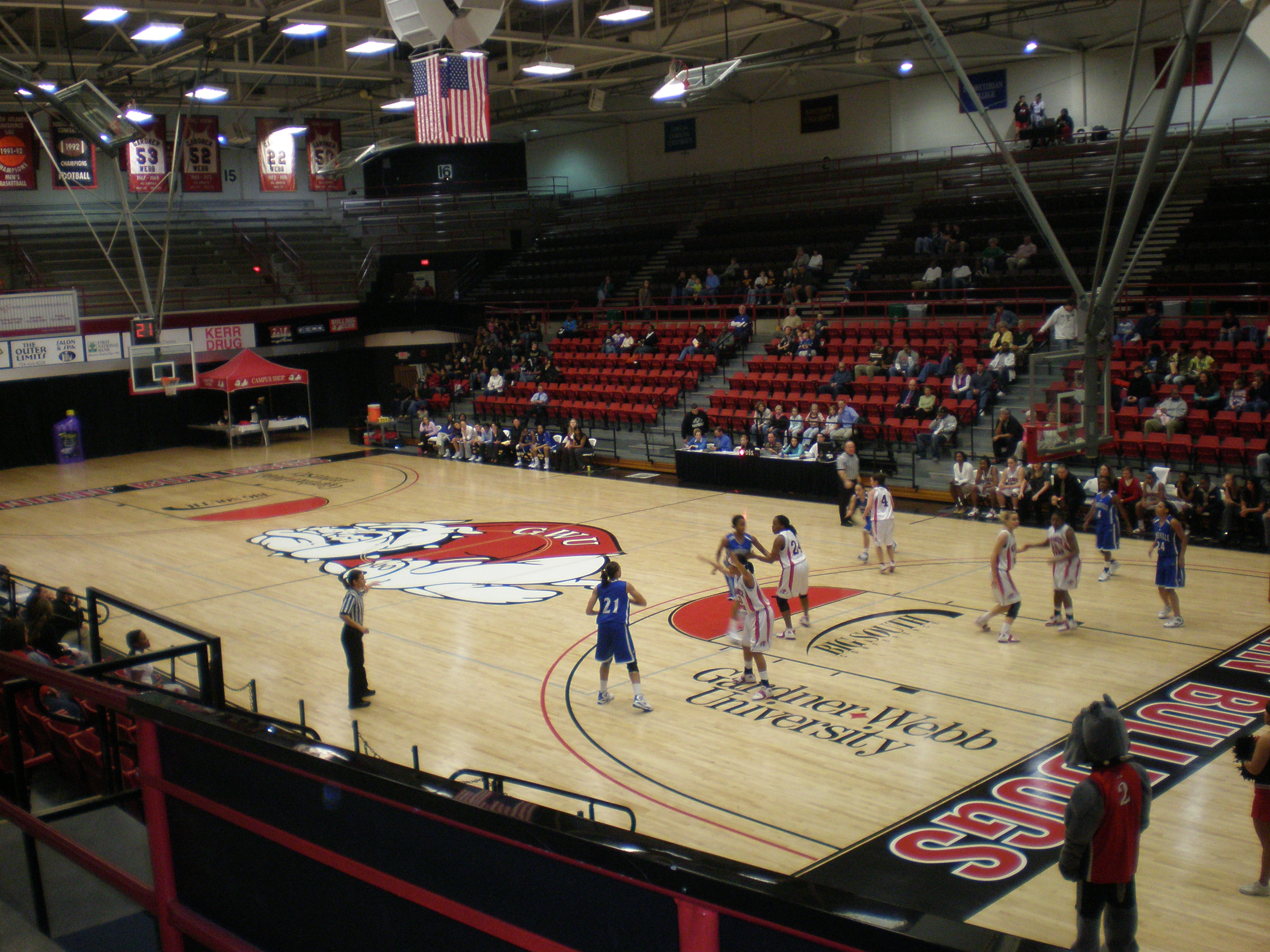
- Women's Basketball Game in Paul Porter Arena
- Interactive map of Paul Porter Arena
- Location: 110 S Main St, Shelby, NC 28017-9797
- Coordinates: 35.246538°N 81.669518°W
- Capacity: 3,500
- Surface: Hardwood

Tenants
- Gardner–Webb Runnin' Bulldogs (basketball and volleyball)

Paul Porter Arena is a 3,500-seat multi-purpose arena in Boiling Springs, North Carolina. It is home to the Gardner–Webb University Runnin' Bulldogs, of the Big South Conference. The Arena was named in honor of Paul B. Porter who was a Board of Advisors Honorary Member and Lifetime Member. The arena is part of the Lutz Yelton Convocation Center (LYCC) a project that was completed in 1982 which houses the Dover Theater and Paul Porter Arena. Although primarily used for basketball and volleyball athletic events, the arena is also used for graduation ceremonies, orientation and the weekly dimensions program. The seating plan in the arena can also be altered, as all of the red seats can be folded and pushed back allowing for greater floor space. Additional floor seating can also be added for events such as graduation or orientation.

== See also ==
- List of NCAA Division I basketball arenas
