= 2017–18 Liberty Flames basketball team =

American college basketball season

2017–18 Liberty Flames basketball

Jim Phelan Classic champions

CIT, semifinals
- Conference: Big South Conference
- Record: 22–15 (9–9 Big South)
- Head coach: Ritchie McKay (3rd (5th overall) season)
- Assistant coaches: Brad Soucie (3rd (5th) season); Kyle Getter (3rd season); Vic Sfera (2nd season)
- Home arena: Vines Center

2017–18 Big South men's basketball standings
	Conf.				Overall
Team	W		L	PCT	W		L	PCT
UNC Asheville	13	–	5	.722	21	–	13	.618
Radford †	12	–	6	.667	23	–	13	.639
Winthrop	12	–	6	.667	19	–	12	.613
Campbell	10	–	8	.556	18	–	16	.529
Liberty	9	–	9	.500	22	–	15	.595
Charleston Southern	9	–	9	.500	15	–	16	.484
High Point	9	–	9	.500	14	–	16	.467
Gardner–Webb	9	–	9	.500	14	–	18	.438
Presbyterian	4	–	14	.222	11	–	21	.344
Longwood	3	–	15	.167	7	–	26	.212
† 2018 Big South tournament winner

The 2017–18 Liberty Flames men's basketball team represented Liberty University in the 2017–18 NCAA Division I men's basketball season. The team played its home games in Lynchburg, Virginia for the 28th consecutive season at Vines Center, with a capacity of 8,085. The team was led by Ritchie McKay, who was in his fifth season, but third season since his return to the program. They were members of the Big South Conference. They finished the season 22–14, 9–9 in Big South play, to finish in a four-way tie for fifth place. They defeated Campbell and UNC Asheville to advance to the championship game of the Big South tournament where they lost to Radford. They were invited to the CollegeInsider.com Tournament where they defeated North Carolina A&T in the first round in a game referred to as the Jim Phelan Classic. They received a second-round bye and defeated Central Michigan in the quarterfinals before losing in the semifinals to UIC.

This was Liberty's final season as members of the Big South Conference, as the school announced on May 17, 2018 that they will be moving to the ASUN Conference for the 2018–19 season.

== Previous season ==
The Flames finished the 2016–17 season 21–14, 14–4 in Big South play, to finish in a third place. They were upset in quarterfinals of the Big South tournament by Radford. They were invited to the CollegeInsider.com Tournament where they defeated Norfolk State in the first round to be champions of the Coach John McLendon Classic. In the second round they defeated Samford before losing in the quarterfinals to UMBC.

== 2017–18 departures ==
Name	Number	Pos.	Height	Weight	Year	Hometown	Notes
AC Reid	2	Guard	6'5"	190	Junior	Spring Branch, TX	Transferred to Tennessee State
Xzavier Barmore	4	Guard	6'0"	165	Freshman	Seneca, SC	Transferred to College of Central Florida
Ray Chen	13	Guard	6'1"	185	Graduate student	Miaoli, Taiwan	Graduated
John Dawson	22	Guard	6'2"	205	Senior	Clovis, NM	Graduated
Josiah Talbert	34	Forward	6'8"	210	Freshman	Olathe, KS	Transferred to Central Missouri

== 2017–18 newcomers ==
College recruiting information
Name	Hometown	School	Height	Weight	Commit date
Elijah Cuffee; G	Poca, WV	Liberty Christian Academy	6 ft 4 in (1.93 m)	185 lb (84 kg)	
Elijah Cuffee; G	Recruit ratings: No ratings found				
Keegan McDowell; G	Cincinnati, OH	Moeller High School	6 ft 5 in (1.96 m)	180 lb (82 kg)	
Keegan McDowell; G	Recruit ratings: No ratings found				
Jay Barber; G	Lynchburg, VA	Liberty Christian Academy	6 ft 4 in (1.93 m)	175 lb (79 kg)	
Jay Barber; G	Recruit ratings: No ratings found				
Brendan Newton; C	Roanoke, VA	Faith Christian School	7 ft 2 in (2.18 m)	235 lb (107 kg)	
Brendan Newton; C	Recruit ratings: Scout: Rivals: 247Sports: ESPN:				
Isaiah Williams; F	Dayton, OH	Akron	6 ft 7 in (2.01 m)	210 lb (95 kg)	
Isaiah Williams; F	Recruit ratings: No ratings found				
Overall recruit ranking:
Note: In many cases, Scout, Rivals, 247Sports, On3, and ESPN may conflict in their listings of height and weight.; In these cases, the average was taken. ESPN grades are on a 100-point scale.; Sources: "2017 Team Ranking". Rivals.

== Roster ==
2017–18 Liberty Flames men's basketball team
Players
Coaches

Pos.	#	Name	Height	Weight	Year	Previous school	Hometown
F	0	Myo Baxter-Bell	6 ft 5 in (1.96 m)	255 lb (116 kg)	RS So	Chaminade Julieen High School	Dayton, OH
G	1	Caleb Homesley	6 ft 4 in (1.93 m)	175 lb (79 kg)	RS So	Porter Ridge High School	Indian Trail, NC
G	3	Lovell Cabbil	6 ft 3 in (1.91 m)	155 lb (70 kg)	Jr	Mansfield Summit High School	Arlington, Texas
G/F	5	Ryan Kemrite	6 ft 4 in (1.93 m)	200 lb (91 kg)	RS Sr	Satch Homeschool	Conroe, TX
G/F	10	Elijah Cuffee	6 ft 4 in (1.93 m)	185 lb (84 kg)	Fr	Liberty Christian Academy	Poca, WV
G	11	Georgie Pacheco-Ortiz	6 ft 1 in (1.85 m)	170 lb (77 kg)	So	Deep Run High School	Ponce, Puerto Rico
F	13	Isaiah Williams	6 ft 7 in (2.01 m)	210 lb (95 kg)	RS Fr	Akron	Dayton, OH
G	14	Brody Hicks	6 ft 4 in (1.93 m)	200 lb (91 kg)	Fr	Cave Spring High School	Roanoke, VA
G	15	Zach Farquhar (W)	5 ft 9 in (1.75 m)	160 lb (73 kg)	RS Jr	Sycamore High School	Cincinnati, OH
G/F	20	Keegan McDowell	6 ft 5 in (1.96 m)	180 lb (82 kg)	Fr	Moeller High School	Cincinnati, OH
F	24	Ezra Talbert	6 ft 8 in (2.03 m)	190 lb (86 kg)	RS Jr	Olathe East High School	Olathe, KS
F	31	Scottie James	6 ft 8 in (2.03 m)	225 lb (102 kg)	RS So	Bradley	Tarpon Springs, FL
G	44	Ryan Hiepler (W)	6 ft 0 in (1.83 m)	180 lb (82 kg)	Jr	Oaks Christian High	Westlake Village, CA
C	55	Brendan Newton	7 ft 2 in (2.18 m)	235 lb (107 kg)	Fr	Faith Christian High	Roanoke, VA

Head coach

- Ritchie McKay (Seattle Pacific)

Assistant coach(es)

- Brad Soucie (Christian Heritage)
- Kyle Getter (Hanover College)
- Vic Sfera (Memphis)

Legend

- (C) Team captain
- (S) Suspended
- (I) Ineligible
- (W) Walk-on
- Injured
- Current redshirt

Roster
Last update: July 23, 2024

== Schedule and results ==
Date time, TV	Rank^{#}	Opponent^{#}	Result	Record	High points	High rebounds	High assists	Site (attendance) city, state
Exhibition
October 26, 2017*; 7:00 p.m.		at VCU; Hurricane Relief Exhibition	W 85–69	–	23 – Talbert	8 – James	4 – Cuffee	Siegel Center (3,497); Richmond, VA
Non-conference regular season
November 10, 2017*; 7:00 p.m.		Clarks Summit; Paradise Jam campus game	W 87–42	1–0	13 – tied	7 – Cabbil	3 – Kemrite	Vines Center (4,094); Lynchburg, VA
November 14, 2017*; 7:00 p.m., ACCN Extra		at Wake Forest	W 79–66	2–0	22 – Cabbil	14 – James	4 – Williams	LJVM Coliseum (5,213); Winston-Salem, NC
November 17, 2017*; 12:00 p.m.		Mercer; Paradise Jam first round	L 48–63	2–1	15 – Cabbil	6 – James	4 – Cabbil	Vines Center (1,022); Lynchburg, VA
November 18, 2017*; 12:00 p.m.		Houston; Paradise Jam consolation	L 66–68	2–2	16 – Pacheco-Ortiz	7 – James	3 – Williams	Vines Center (815); Lynchburg, VA
November 19, 2017*; 12:00 p.m.		vs. Quinnipiac; Paradise Jam 7th-place game	W 84–72	3–2	21 – James	8 – James	2 – 5 tied	Vines Center (640); Lynchburg, VA
November 25, 2017*; 2:00 p.m.		Toccoa Falls	W 96–50	4–2	18 – Baxter-Bell	10 – James	6 – Homesley	Vines Center (1,675); Lynchburg, VA
November 27, 2017*; 7:00 p.m., ESPN3		Howard	W 75–55	5–2	17 – Pacheco-Ortiz	10 – James	4 – tied	Vines Center (2,169); Lynchburg, VA
December 2, 2017*; 1:00 p.m., ESPN3		UNC Greensboro	L 75–76 ^{3OT}	5–3	19 – James	15 – James	3 – Cabbil	Vines Center (2,294); Lynchburg, VA
December 4, 2017*; 7:00 p.m., ESPN3		at Georgia State	W 77–74 ^{OT}	6–3	17 – James	9 – James	5 – Cabbil	GSU Sports Arena (1,074); Atlanta, GA
December 8, 2017*; 7:00 p.m., ESPN3		Maryland Eastern Shore	W 71–49	7–3	12 – Kemrite	7 – James	4 – 3 tied	Vines Center (2,380); Lynchburg, VA
December 16, 2017*; 1:00 p.m.		Kentucky Christian	W 96–40	8–3	21 – Cabbil	8 – Homesley	5 – Cabbil	Vines Center (2,063); Lynchburg, VA
December 21, 2017*; 11:00 a.m.		vs. Fort Wayne; New Orleans Classic	L 64–75	8–4	15 – 3 tied	12 – James	4 – tied	Xavier University Academic Convocation Center (300); New Orleans, LA
December 22, 2017*; 1:00 p.m.		vs. Alabama State; New Orleans Classic	W 87–70	9–4	19 – Pacheco-Ortiz	8 – James	7 – Pacheco-Ortiz	Xavier University Academic Convocation Center (250); New Orleans, LA
Big South regular season
December 30, 2017; 7:00 p.m.		at Gardner–Webb	L 55–58	9–5 (0–1)	11 – James	13 – James	4 – Pacheco-Ortiz	Paul Porter Arena (1,250); Boiling Springs, NC
January 2, 2018; 7:00 p.m., ESPN3		Charleston Southern	W 70–53	10–5 (1–1)	27 – Pacheco-Ortiz	15 – James	5 – Cuffee	Vines Center (1,688); Lynchburg, VA
January 6, 2018; 4:00 p.m., ESPN3		Presbyterian	W 60–48	11–5 (2–1)	14 – Pacheco-Ortiz	12 – James	4 – Pacheco-Ortiz	Vines Center (2,216); Lynchburg, VA
January 9, 2018; 7:00 p.m., ESPN3		at Winthrop	W 73–70	12–5 (3–1)	19 – Cabbil	6 – tied	5 – Cabbil	Winthrop Coliseum (1,085); Rock Hill, SC
January 12, 2018; 7:00 p.m., ESPN3		Longwood	L 51–58	12–6 (3–2)	10 – Cabbil	6 – James	3 – Pacheco-Ortiz	Vines Center (1,989); Lynchburg, VA
January 15, 2018; 7:00 p.m., ESPN3		at Radford	L 57–59 ^{OT}	12–7 (3–3)	14 – Cabbil	4 – Cabbil	4 – Pacheco-Ortiz	Dedmon Center (1,493); Radford, VA
January 18, 2018; 7:00 p.m.		at High Point	L 60–71	12–8 (3–4)	17 – Baxter-Bell	10 – James	3 – Cabbil	Millis Athletic Center (1,214); High Point, NC
January 21, 2018; 2:00 p.m., Stadium		UNC Asheville	L 68–84	12–9 (3–5)	19 – James	8 – Homesley	5 – Homesley	Vines Center (2,426); Lynchburg, VA
January 23, 2018; 7:00 p.m., ESPN3		Campbell	L 85–94	12–10 (3–6)	24 – Pacheco-Ortiz	6 – Kemrite	4 – Pacheco-Ortiz	Vines Center (2,452); Lynchburg, VA
January 27, 2018; 4:00 p.m.		at Presbyterian	W 81–66	13–10 (4–6)	21 – Kemrite	7 – James	6 – Pacheco-Ortiz	Templeton Center (493); Clinton, SC
February 1, 2018; 7:00 p.m., ESPN3		Winthrop	W 77–61	14–10 (5–6)	21 – James	8 – James	5 – Pacheco-Ortiz	Vines Center (2,422); Lynchburg, VA
February 3, 2018; 2:00 p.m.		at Longwood	W 67–55	15–10 (6–6)	26 – James	10 – James	4 – Homesley	Willett Hall (1,807); Farmville, VA
February 7, 2018; 7:30 p.m., ESPN3		at Charleston Southern	L 75–87	15–11 (6–7)	15 – Cabbil	6 – James	4 – Pacheco-Ortiz	CSU Field House (725); North Charleston, SC
February 10, 2018; 7:00 p.m., ESPN3		Gardner–Webb	W 77–65	16–11 (7–7)	15 – tied	9 – tied	7 – Cabbil	Vines Center (3,197); Lynchburg, VA
February 15, 2018; 7:00 p.m.		at UNC Ahseville	W 82–69 ^{OT}	17–11 (8–7)	23 – James	15 – James	6 – Cuffee	Kimmel Arena (1,719); Asheville, NC
February 18, 2018; 2:00 p.m., ESPN3		at Campbell	L 69–79	17–12 (8–8)	14 – Kemrite	6 – tied	4 – 3 tied	Gore Arena (2,126); Buies Creek, NC
February 22, 2018; 7:00 p.m., ESPN3		Radford	L 50–63	17–13 (8–9)	15 – James	4 – Pacheco-Ortiz	6 – Cabbil	Vines Center (2,669); Lynchburg, VA
February 24, 2018; 2:00 p.m., ESPN3		High Point	W 65–45	18–13 (9–9)	21 – James	7 – James	5 – Pacheco-Ortiz	Vines Center (3,517); Lynchburg, VA
Big South tournament
March 1, 2018; 9:30 p.m., ESPN3	(5)	vs. (4) Campbell; Quarterfinals	W 73–59	19–13	14 – tied	9 – James	2 – 3 tied	Kimmel Arena (2,276); Asheville, NC
March 2, 2018; 8:30 p.m., ESPN3	(5)	at (1) UNC Asheville; Semifinals	W 69–64	20–13	18 – James	14 – James	3 – Cabbil	Kimmel Arena (2,318); Asheville, NC
March 4, 2018; 1:00 p.m., ESPN	(5)	at (2) Radford; Championship	L 52–55	20–14	20 – James	13 – James	7 – Cabbil	Dedmon Center (3,859); Radford, VA
CIT
March 12, 2018*; 6:00 p.m., CBSSN		North Carolina A&T; First round – Jim Phelan Classic	W 65–52	21–14	16 – Homesley	12 – James	3 – tied	Vines Center (486); Lynchburg, VA
March 24, 2018*; 2:00 p.m.		Central Michigan; Quarterfinals	W 84–71	22–14	20 – James	9 – James	13 – Cabbil	Vines Center (476); Lynchburg, VA
March 28, 2018*; 7:00 p.m., CBSSN		UIC; Semifinals	L 51–67	22–15	13 – Cabbil	9 – tied	3 – tied	Vines Center (2,248); Lynchburg, VA
*Non-conference game. ^{#}Rankings from AP poll. (#) Tournament seedings in parentheses. All times are in Eastern.
