= 2017–18 Winthrop Eagles men's basketball team =

American college basketball season

2017–18 Winthrop Eagles men's basketball
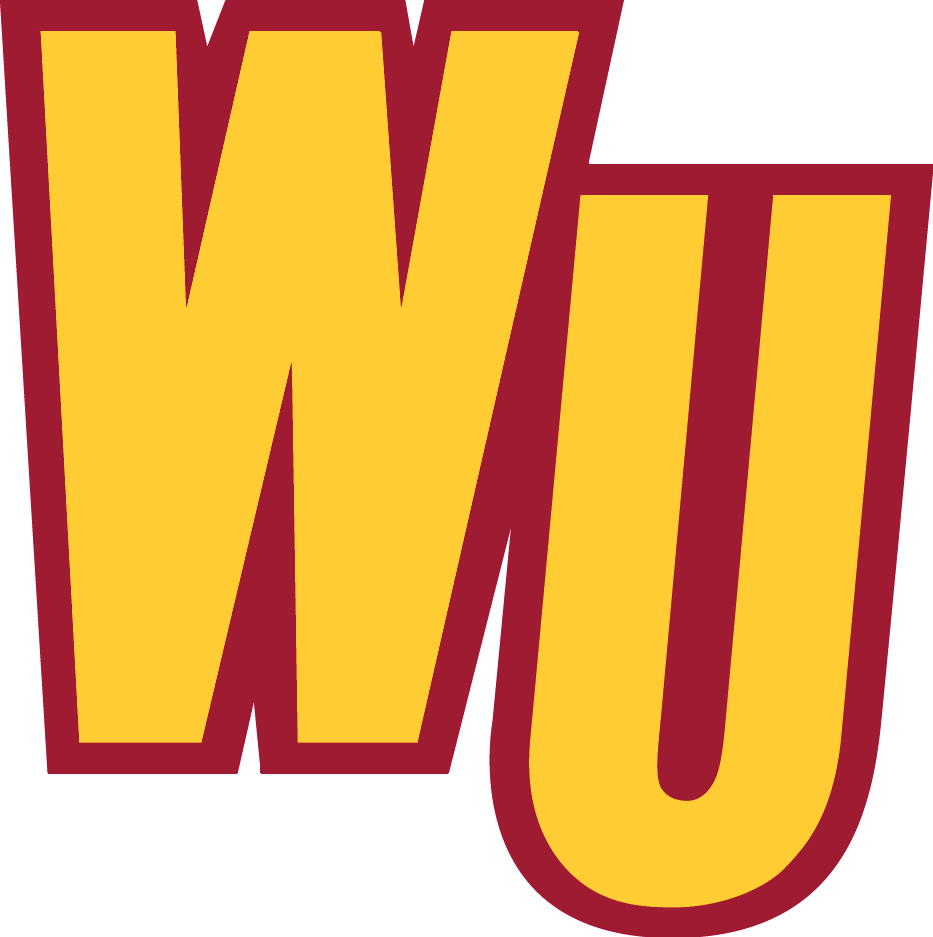
- Conference: Big South Conference
- Record: 19–12 (12–6 Big South)
- Head coach: Pat Kelsey (6th season)
- Assistant coaches: Mark Prosser; Brian Kloman; Mike Howland
- Home arena: Winthrop Coliseum

2017–18 Big South men's basketball standings
	Conf.				Overall
Team	W		L	PCT	W		L	PCT
UNC Asheville	13	–	5	.722	21	–	13	.618
Radford †	12	–	6	.667	23	–	13	.639
Winthrop	12	–	6	.667	19	–	12	.613
Campbell	10	–	8	.556	18	–	16	.529
Liberty	9	–	9	.500	22	–	15	.595
Charleston Southern	9	–	9	.500	15	–	16	.484
High Point	9	–	9	.500	14	–	16	.467
Gardner–Webb	9	–	9	.500	14	–	18	.438
Presbyterian	4	–	14	.222	11	–	21	.344
Longwood	3	–	15	.167	7	–	26	.212
† 2018 Big South tournament winner

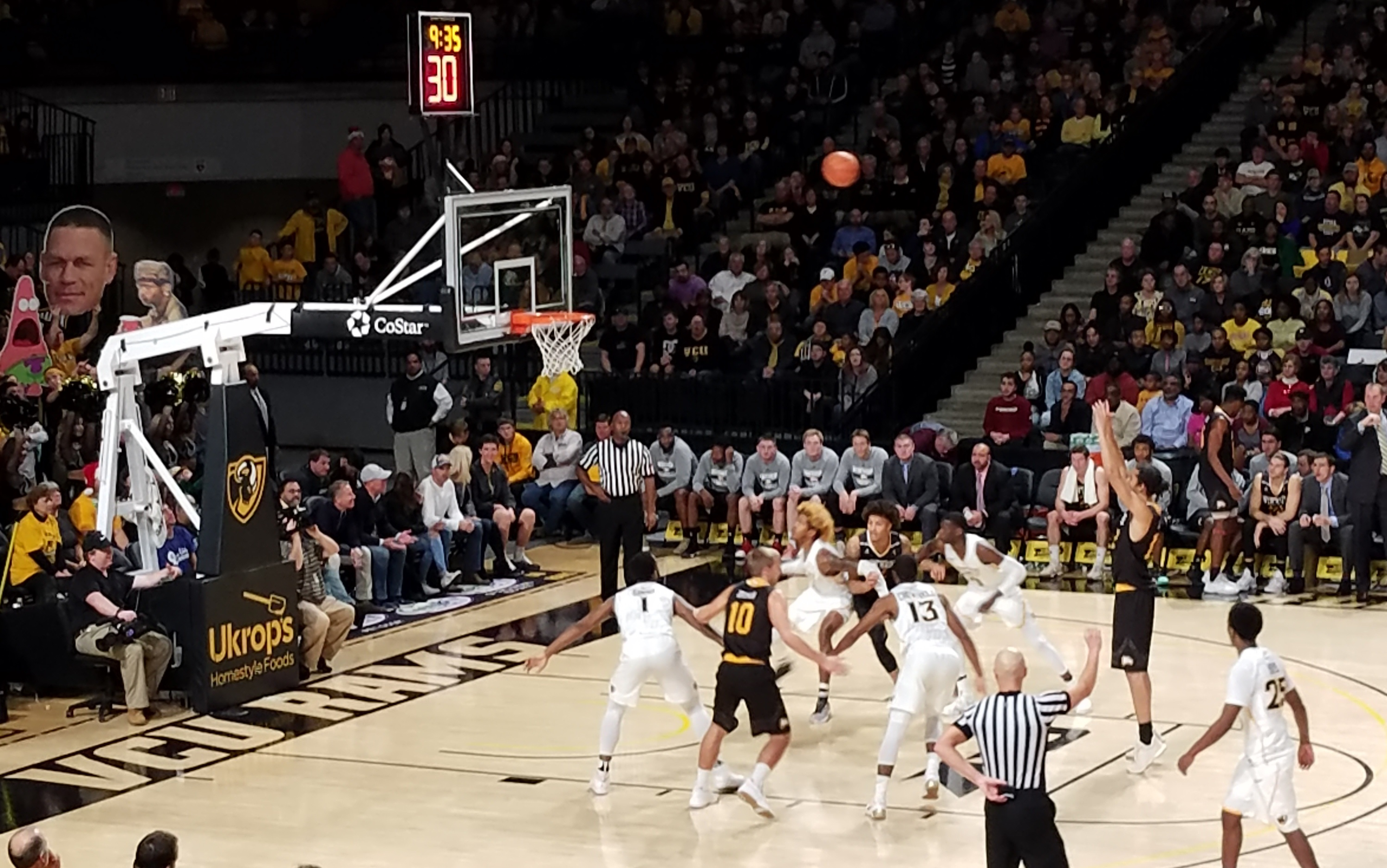
Xavier Cooks shooting a free throw against VCU.

The 2017–18 Winthrop Eagles men's basketball team represented Winthrop University during the 2017–18 NCAA Division I men's basketball season. The Eagles, led by sixth-year head coach Pat Kelsey, played their home games at the Winthrop Coliseum in Rock Hill, South Carolina as members of the Big South Conference. They finished the season 19–12, 12–6 in Big South play to finish in a tie for second place. They defeated Gardner–Webb in the quarterfinals of the Big South tournament before losing in the semifinals to Radford.

== Previous season ==
The Eagles finished the season 26–7, 15–3 in Big South play to finish in a tie for the regular season Big South championship. As the No. 1 seed in the Big South tournament, they defeated Charleston Southern, Gardner–Webb, and Campbell to win the tournament championship. As a result, they received the conference's automatic bid to the NCAA tournament, their first bid since 2010. In the NCAA Tournament, they lost in the first round to Butler.

On March 21, 2017, head coach Pat Kelsey initially left Winthrop to take the head coaching job at Massachusetts, but backed out two days later citing "personal reasons" and returned to Winthrop.

== Preseason ==
The Eagles were picked to finish second in conference play in a preseason Big South poll. Senior G/F Xavier Cooks was named to the All-Big South preseason first team.

== Roster ==
2017–18 Winthrop Eagles men's basketball team
Players
Coaches

Pos.	#	Name	Height	Weight	Year	Hometown
G	0	Nych Smith	5 ft 10 in (1.78 m)	180 lb (82 kg)	RS Jr	Memphis, Tennessee
G	1	Keondre Shumacher	6 ft 0 in (1.83 m)	175 lb (79 kg)	RS Fr	Normal, Illinois
C	2	Tom Pupavac	6 ft 10 in (2.08 m)	220 lb (100 kg)	RS Fr	Geelong, Australia
G	3	Kellen Blake	6 ft 2 in (1.88 m)	165 lb (75 kg)	Sr	Arlington, Virginia
SF	4	Mitch Hill	6 ft 4 in (1.93 m)	200 lb (91 kg)	Sr	Cincinnati, Ohio
G	10	Anders Broman	6 ft 2 in (1.88 m)	190 lb (86 kg)	RS Sr	Duluth, Minnesota
G	11	Charles Falden	6 ft 3 in (1.91 m)	190 lb (86 kg)	RS Fr	Richmond, Virginia
G/F	12	Xavier Cooks	6 ft 8 in (2.03 m)	185 lb (84 kg)	Sr	Wollongong, Australia
G	13	Bjorn Broman	6 ft 0 in (1.83 m)	177 lb (80 kg)	Jr	Duluth, Minnesota
G	14	Adam Pickett	6 ft 1 in (1.85 m)	195 lb (88 kg)	Jr	Staunton, Virginia
G	15	Jermaine Ukaegbu	6 ft 2 in (1.88 m)	200 lb (91 kg)	Jr	Silver Spring, Maryland
G	21	Kyle Zunic	6 ft 2 in (1.88 m)	177 lb (80 kg)	Fr	Wollongong, Australia
F	22	Austin Awad	6 ft 6 in (1.98 m)	200 lb (91 kg)	Jr	Melbourne, Florida
F	25	Josh Ferguson	6 ft 8 in (2.03 m)	200 lb (91 kg)	So	Miami, Florida
F	30	Raivis Scerbinskis	6 ft 8 in (2.03 m)	215 lb (98 kg)	RS Fr	Riga, Latvia
PF	32	Freddy Poole	6 ft 7 in (2.01 m)	240 lb (109 kg)	Sr	Columbia, South Carolina
G	33	Matt Erps	5 ft 11 in (1.8 m)	180 lb (82 kg)	Sr	Spartanburg, South Carolina

Head coach

- Pat Kelsey (Xavier)

Assistant coach(es)

- Mark Prosser (Marist)
- Brian Kloman (Tennessee)
- Mike Howland (DePauw)

Legend

- (C) Team captain
- (S) Suspended
- (I) Ineligible
- (W) Walk-on
- Injured
- Current redshirt

Roster
Last update: October 25, 2017

== Schedule and results ==
Date time, TV	Rank^{#}	Opponent^{#}	Result	Record	Site (attendance) city, state
Non-conference regular season
Nov 10, 2017*; 7:00 pm		Southern Illinois	L 66–81	0–1	Winthrop Coliseum (2,675); Rock Hill, SC
Nov 14, 2017*; 8:00 pm		at Colorado State	L 76–80	0–2	Moby Arena (2,697); Fort Collins, CO
Nov 18, 2017*; 4:00 pm		Central Penn	W 106–65	1–2	Winthrop Coliseum (1,968); Rock Hill, SC
Nov 21, 2017*; 11:00 am		Mars Hill	W 104–49	2–2	Winthrop Coliseum (4,761); Rock Hill, SC
Nov 24, 2017*; 7:00 pm, SECN		at Auburn	L 85–119	2–3	Auburn Arena (7,197); Auburn, AL
Nov 26, 2017*; 7:00 pm		South Carolina State	W 86–61	3–3	Winthrop Coliseum (1,107); Rock Hill, SC
Nov 29, 2017*; 7:00 pm, ESPN3		at Furman	W 93–74	4–3	Timmons Arena (1,351); Greenville, SC
Dec 2, 2017*; 2:00 pm		Reinhardt	W 107–76	5–3	Winthrop Coliseum (759); Rock Hill, SC
Dec 5, 2017*; 7:00 pm, SECN		at Georgia	L 82–87	5–4	Stegeman Coliseum (6,405); Athens, GA
Dec 16, 2017*; 2:00 pm		at Alabama State	W 88–80	6–4	Dunn–Oliver Acadome; Montgomery, AL
Dec 19, 2017*; 7:00 pm, MASN		at VCU	L 55–69	6–5	Siegel Center (7,637); Richmond, VA
Big South regular season
Dec 30, 2017; 2:00 pm		High Point	W 76–60	7–5 (1–0)	Winthrop Coliseum (1,168); Rock Hill, SC
Jan 3, 2018; 7:00 pm		at Radford	L 79–85	7–6 (1–1)	Dedmon Center (634); Radford, VA
Jan 6, 2018; 2:00 pm		at Campbell	L 77–88	7–7 (1–2)	Gore Arena (1,620); Buies Creek, NC
Jan 9, 2018; 7:00 pm, ESPN3		Liberty	L 70–73	7–8 (1–3)	Winthrop Coliseum (1,085); Rock Hill, SC
Jan 12, 2018; 7:30 pm		at Charleston Southern	W 64–53	8–8 (2–3)	CSU Field House (881); North Charleston, SC
Jan 15, 2018; 7:00 pm		Gardner–Webb	W 90–67	9–8 (3–3)	Winthrop Coliseum (996); Rock Hill, SC
Jan 18, 2018; 9:00 pm, ESPNU		UNC Asheville	W 85–58	10–8 (4–3)	Winthrop Coliseum (3,347); Rock Hill, SC
Jan 21, 2018; 4:00 pm		at Presbyterian	W 81–68	11–8 (5–3)	Templeton Center (433); Clinton, SC
Jan 24, 2018; 7:00 pm		at Longwood	W 95–78	12–8 (6–3)	Willett Hall (1,737); Farmville, VA
Jan 27, 2018; 2:00 pm		Campbell	W 75–64	13–8 (7–3)	Winthrop Coliseum (1,271); Rock Hill, SC
Feb 1, 2018; 7:00 pm		at Liberty	L 61–77	13–9 (7–4)	Vines Center (2,422); Lynchburg, VA
Feb 3, 2018; 2:00 pm		Radford	W 75–57	14–9 (8–4)	Winthrop Coliseum (1,980); Rock Hill, SC
Feb 7, 2018; 7:00 pm, ESPN3		Presbyterian	W 63–49	15–9 (9–4)	Winthrop Coliseum (655); Rock Hill, SC
Feb 10, 2018; 7:00 pm		at High Point	W 82–70	16–9 (10–4)	Millis Athletic Center (1,342); High Point, NC
Feb 15, 2018; 7:00 pm		at Gardner–Webb	W 90–71	17–9 (11–4)	Paul Porter Arena (1,252); Boiling Springs, NC
Feb 18, 2018; 2:00 pm		Longwood	W 79–64	18–9 (12–4)	Winthrop Coliseum (2,331); Rock Hill, SC
Feb 22, 2018; 7:00 pm		at UNC Asheville	L 75–89	18–10 (12–5)	Kimmel Arena (2,978); Asheville, NC
Feb 24, 2018; 2:00 pm		Charleston Southern	L 75–78	18–11 (12–6)	Winthrop Coliseum (2,418); Rock Hill, SC
Big South tournament
Mar 1, 2018; 3:30 pm, ESPN3	(3)	vs. (6) Gardner–Webb; Quarterfinals	W 72–68	19–11	Kimmel Arena (1,159); Asheville, NC
Mar 2, 2018; 6:00 pm, ESPN3	(3)	vs. (2) Radford; Semifinals	L 52–61	19–12	Kimmel Arena (2,318); Asheville, NC
*Non-conference game. ^{#}Rankings from AP Poll. (#) Tournament seedings in parentheses. All times are in Eastern Time.
