= 2017–18 Charleston Southern Buccaneers men's basketball team =

American college basketball season

2017–18 Charleston Southern Buccaneers men's basketball
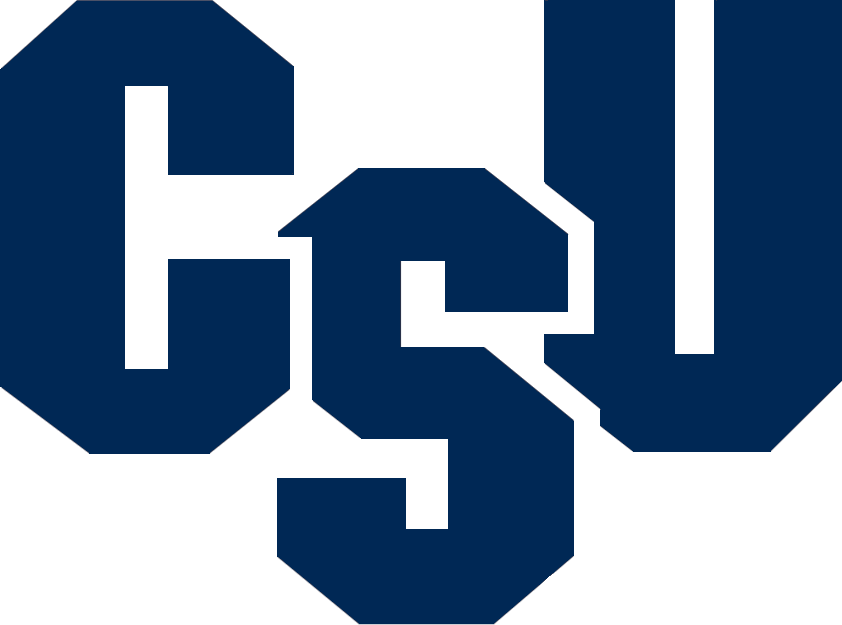
- Conference: Big South Conference
- Record: 15–16 (9–9 Big South)
- Head coach: Barclay Radebaugh (13th season)
- Assistant coaches: Ahmad Smith; Rick Duckett; Thomas Butters
- Home arena: CSU Field House

2017–18 Big South men's basketball standings
	Conf.				Overall
Team	W		L	PCT	W		L	PCT
UNC Asheville	13	–	5	.722	21	–	13	.618
Radford †	12	–	6	.667	23	–	13	.639
Winthrop	12	–	6	.667	19	–	12	.613
Campbell	10	–	8	.556	18	–	16	.529
Liberty	9	–	9	.500	22	–	15	.595
Charleston Southern	9	–	9	.500	15	–	16	.484
High Point	9	–	9	.500	14	–	16	.467
Gardner–Webb	9	–	9	.500	14	–	18	.438
Presbyterian	4	–	14	.222	11	–	21	.344
Longwood	3	–	15	.167	7	–	26	.212
† 2018 Big South tournament winner

The 2017–18 Charleston Southern Buccaneers men's basketball team represented Charleston Southern University during the 2017–18 NCAA Division I men's basketball season. The Buccaneers, led by 13th-year head coach Barclay Radebaugh, played their home games at the CSU Field House in North Charleston, South Carolina as members of the Big South Conference. They finished the season 15–16, 9–9 in Big South play to finish in a four-way tie for fifth place. As the No. 8 seed in the Big South tournament, they defeated Presbyterian in the first round before losing in the quarterfinals to UNC Asheville.

== Previous season ==
The Buccaneers They finished the season 12–19, 7–11 in Big South play to finish in a tie for seventh place. They defeated Presbyterian in the first round of the Big South tournament before losing to Winthrop in the quarterfinals.

== Roster ==
2017–18 Charleston Southern Buccaneers men's basketball team
Players
Coaches

Pos.	#	Name	Height	Weight	Year	Hometown
G	0	Jamaal David	6 ft 6 in (1.98 m)	190 lb (86 kg)	RS Fr	Potomac, Maryland
F	1	Travis McConico	6 ft 6 in (1.98 m)	200 lb (91 kg)	Jr	Jacksonville, Florida
G	2	Cortez Mitchell	6 ft 2 in (1.88 m)	180 lb (82 kg)	Sr	Jackson, Mississippi
G	4	Deontaye Buskey	6 ft 1 in (1.85 m)	160 lb (73 kg)	Fr	Daphne, Alabama
F	5	Jamar Martin	6 ft 5 in (1.96 m)	215 lb (98 kg)	Sr	Toronto, Ontario, Canada
F/C	10	Abdul Sarki	6 ft 9 in (2.06 m)	230 lb (104 kg)	RS Jr	Minna, Nigeria
G	11	Christian Keeling	6 ft 4 in (1.93 m)	175 lb (79 kg)	So	Augusta, Georgia
F	12	Ty Jones	6 ft 6 in (1.98 m)	215 lb (98 kg)	Fr	Pontotoc, Mississippi
F	13	Jordan Jones	6 ft 8 in (2.03 m)	205 lb (93 kg)	So	Baltimore, Maryland
G	15	Jamal Thomas	6 ft 3 in (1.91 m)	200 lb (91 kg)	Sr	Toronto, Canada
F	20	Alex Stewart	6 ft 4 in (1.93 m)	190 lb (86 kg)	Fr	Chapin, South Carolina
F	21	Nathan Payne	6 ft 4 in (1.93 m)	180 lb (82 kg)	RS Fr	Pickens, South Carolina
F	23	Javis Howard	6 ft 8 in (2.03 m)	220 lb (100 kg)	Sr	Irmo, South Carolina
G	24	Phlandrous Jr. Fleming	6 ft 4 in (1.93 m)	195 lb (88 kg)	Fr	Athens, Georgia
F	30	Sean Price	6 ft 5 in (1.96 m)	200 lb (91 kg)	Fr	Port Charlotte, Florida
F	33	JC Cavin	6 ft 0 in (1.83 m)	170 lb (77 kg)	Fr	Greenville, South Carolina

Head coach

- Barclay Radebaugh (ETSU)

Assistant coach(es)

- Ahmad Smith (Appalachian St.)
- Rick Duckett (North Carolina)
- Thomas Butters (Clemson)

Legend

- (C) Team captain
- (S) Suspended
- (I) Ineligible
- (W) Walk-on
- Injured
- Current redshirt

Roster
Last update: August 31, 2017

== Schedule and results ==
Date time, TV	Rank^{#}	Opponent^{#}	Result	Record	Site (attendance) city, state
Non-conference regular season
Nov 10, 2017*; 7:00 pm		at Davidson	L 62–110	0–1	John M. Belk Arena (3,705); Davidson, NC
Nov 12, 2017*; 4:00 pm, ACCN Extra		at NC State	L 56–78	0–2	PNC Arena (13,602); Raleigh, NC
Nov 15, 2017*; 7:30 pm		Columbia International	W 98–58	1–2	CSU Field House (813); North Charleston, SC
Nov 18, 2017*; 2:00 pm, ESPN3		at USC Upstate	W 82–72	2–2	Hodge Center (528); Spartanburg, SC
Nov 20, 2017*; 5:00 pm		Toccoa Falls	W 107–36	3–2	CSU Field House (422); North Charleston, SC
Nov 25, 2017*; 9:00 pm, ESPN3		at Illinois State	W 64–62 ^{OT}	4–2	Redbird Arena (3,831); Normal, IL
Nov 28, 2017*; 7:30 pm		VMI	L 68–76	4–3	CSU Field House (881); North Charleston, SC
Dec 12, 2017*; 1:00 pm		at South Carolina State	L 88–91 ^{OT}	4–4	SHM Memorial Center (154); Orangeburg, SC
Dec 15, 2017*; 7:30 pm		Eastern Kentucky	L 65–70	4–5	CSU Field House (556); North Charleston, SC
Dec 18, 2017*; 7:00 pm, ESPNU		at No. 24 Florida State	L 58–69	4–6	Donald L. Tucker Center (5,836); Tallahassee, FL
Dec 21, 2017*; 7:30 pm		Johnson & Wales (NC)	W 102–58	5–6	CSU Field House (140); North Charleston, SC
Big South regular season
Dec 30, 2017; 5:30 pm		Longwood	W 84–43	6–6 (1–0)	CSU Field House (426); North Charleston, SC
Jan 2, 2018; 7:00 pm, ESPN3		at Liberty	L 53–70	6–7 (1–1)	Vines Center (1,688); Lynchburg, VA
Jan 6, 2018; 7:00 pm		at High Point	L 59–80	6–8 (1–2)	Millis Athletic Center (1,521); High Point, NC
Jan 9, 2018; 7:30 pm		Radford	L 61–64	6–9 (1–3)	CSU Field House (711); North Charleston, SC
Jan 12, 2017; 7:30 pm		Winthrop	L 53–64	5–11 (1–4)	CSU Field House (881); North Charleston, SC
Jan 15, 2018; 7:00 pm, ESPN3		at UNC Asheville	L 73–83	6–11 (1–5)	Kimmel Arena (1,723); Asheville, NC
Jan 18, 2018; 7:00 pm		at Campbell	L 47–62	6–12 (1–6)	Gore Arena (1,721); Buies Creek, NC
Jan 21, 2017; 5:30 pm		Gardner–Webb	W 83–68	7–12 (2–6)	CSU Field House (525); North Charleston, SC
Jan 24, 2017; 7:30 pm		Presbyterian	L 49–57	7–13 (2–7)	CSU Field House (686); North Charleston, SC
Jan 27, 2018; 2:00 pm, Stadium		at Radford	W 84–81 ^{OT}	8–13 (3–7)	Dedmon Center (1,707); Radford, VA
Feb 1, 2017; 7:30 pm		High Point	W 83–74	9–13 (4–7)	CSU Field House (610); North Charleston, SC
Feb 3, 2018; 7:00 pm		at Gardner–Webb	L 61–63	9–14 (4–8)	Paul Porter Arena (1,449); Boiling Springs, NC
Feb 7, 2017; 7:30 pm		Liberty	W 87–75	10–14 (5–8)	CSU Field House (725); North Charleston, SC
Feb 10, 2018; 4:00 pm		at Presbyterian	W 64–54	11–14 (6–8)	Templeton Center (1,168); Clinton, SC
Feb 15, 2018; 7:00 pm		at Longwood	W 77–65	12–14 (7–8)	Willett Hall (1,173); Farmville, VA
Feb 18, 2017; 5:30 pm		UNC Asheville	L 80–85 ^{OT}	12–15 (7–9)	CSU Field House (722); North Charleston, SC
Feb 22, 2017; 7:30 pm		Campbell	W 72–68	13–15 (8–9)	CSU Field House (696); North Charleston, SC
Feb 24, 2018; 2:00 pm		at Winthrop	W 78–75	14–15 (9–9)	Winthrop Coliseum (2,418); Rock Hill, SC
Big South tournament
Feb 27, 2018; 7:00 pm	(8)	(9) Presbyterian; First round	W 68–51	15–15	CSU Field House (806); North Charleston, SC
Mar 1, 2018; 7:00 pm, ESPN3	(8)	at (1) UNC Asheville; Quarterfinals	L 66–71	15–16	Kimmel Arena (2,276); Asheville, NC
*Non-conference game. ^{#}Rankings from AP Poll. (#) Tournament seedings in parentheses. All times are in Eastern Time Source.
