= 2017–18 Longwood Lancers men's basketball team =

American college basketball season

2017–18 Longwood Lancers men's basketball
- Conference: Big South Conference
- Record: 7–26 (3–15 Big South)
- Head coach: Jayson Gee (5th season)
- Associate head coach: Jake Luhn (5th season)
- Assistant coaches: Cody Anderson (3rd season); Ron Bradley (2nd season)
- Home arena: Willett Hall

2017–18 Big South men's basketball standings
	Conf.				Overall
Team	W		L	PCT	W		L	PCT
UNC Asheville	13	–	5	.722	21	–	13	.618
Radford †	12	–	6	.667	23	–	13	.639
Winthrop	12	–	6	.667	19	–	12	.613
Campbell	10	–	8	.556	18	–	16	.529
Liberty	9	–	9	.500	22	–	15	.595
Charleston Southern	9	–	9	.500	15	–	16	.484
High Point	9	–	9	.500	14	–	16	.467
Gardner–Webb	9	–	9	.500	14	–	18	.438
Presbyterian	4	–	14	.222	11	–	21	.344
Longwood	3	–	15	.167	7	–	26	.212
† 2018 Big South tournament winner

The 2017–18 Longwood Lancers men's basketball team represented Longwood University during the 2017–18 NCAA Division I men's basketball season. They were led by head coach Jayson Gee, in his fifth season, and played their home games at Willett Hall in Farmville, Virginia as members of the Big South Conference. They finished the season 7–26, 3–15 in Big South play to finish in last place. They defeated High Point in the first round of the Big South tournament to advance to the quarterfinals where they lost to Radford.

On March 2, 2018, head coach Jayson Gee was fired. He finished at Longwood with a five-year record of 42–120. On March 22, the school hired UMBC assistant Griff Aldrich as head coach.

== Previous season ==
The 2016–17 Lancers finished the season 6–24, 3–15 in Big South play to finish in ninth place. They lost in the first round of the Big South tournament to Charleston Southern.

== Roster ==
2017–18 Longwood Lancers men's basketball team
Players
Coaches

Pos.	#	Name	Height	Weight	Year	Previous school	Hometown
G	0	Dominic Ezeani	5 ft 11 in (1.8 m)	165 lb (75 kg)	So	Our Lady of Good Counsel HS	Silver Spring, Maryland
G	1	Isaiah Walton	6 ft 5 in (1.96 m)	190 lb (86 kg)	RS Jr	Elyria HS/Iowa Western CC/UC Davis	Oberlin, Ohio
G	2	B.K. Ashe	6 ft 1 in (1.85 m)	160 lb (73 kg)	RS Sr	Friendship Collegiate/Mount St. Mary's	Washington, D.C.
G	3	Kamil Chapman	6 ft 1 in (1.85 m)	185 lb (84 kg)	Fr	Comenius School	Charlotte, North Carolina
G	4	Juan Munoz	5 ft 11 in (1.8 m)	165 lb (75 kg)	RS So	Panther Creek HS	Morrisville, North Carolina
G	5	Bryan Gee (injured)	6 ft 0 in (1.83 m)	180 lb (82 kg)	RS Jr	Cornerstone Christian	Cleveland, Ohio
G	10	Keoni Wallington	5 ft 11 in (1.8 m)	180 lb (82 kg)	Jr	Holy Trinity Episcopal Academy/Wallace State/Eastern Florida State	Palm Bay, Florida
F	11	Jahleem Montague	6 ft 8 in (2.03 m)	230 lb (104 kg)	RS So	Atlantic City HS/Palm Beach State	Atlantic City, New Jersey
G	12	Charles Glover	6 ft 1 in (1.85 m)	195 lb (88 kg)	RS Sr	Gonzaga College HS/Mount St. Mary's	Bowie, Maryland
F	13	Spencer Franklin	6 ft 8 in (2.03 m)	210 lb (95 kg)	RS Jr	Trimble Technical/Seward County College/Collin College	Fort Worth, Texas
F	15	Pernell Adgei	6 ft 8 in (2.03 m)	220 lb (100 kg)	Jr	Pope John Paul The Great/Panola/Loyola	Dumfries, Virginia
F	20	Jordan Cintron	6 ft 8 in (2.03 m)	205 lb (93 kg)	Fr	DeWitt Clinton/Bull City Prep	Bronx, New York
F	21	JaShaun Smith	6 ft 5 in (1.96 m)	195 lb (88 kg)	So	Legacy Charter School	Garner, North Carolina
F	23	Boaz Williams	6 ft 7 in (2.01 m)	220 lb (100 kg)	Jr	Victory Prep/Collin College/Lamar	Houston, Texas
F	24	Damarion Geter	6 ft 8 in (2.03 m)	235 lb (107 kg)	RS Sr	Dunbar HS	Dayton, Ohio
G/F	30	Chris Shields	6 ft 8 in (2.03 m)	205 lb (93 kg)	Jr	Hedgesville HS/Fishburne Military	Hedgesville, West Virginia
F/C	41	Drew Romich	6 ft 10 in (2.08 m)	255 lb (116 kg)	Jr	Pope HS/Georgia College/Stetson	Marietta, Georgia

Head coach

- Jayson Gee (University of Charleston)

Assistant coach(es)

- Jake Luhn (UMass Boston)
- Cody Anderson (Georgia)
- Ron Bradley (Eastern Nazarene)

Legend

- (C) Team captain
- (S) Suspended
- (I) Ineligible
- (W) Walk-on
- Injured
- Current redshirt

Roster
Last update: October 25, 2017

== Schedule and results ==
Date time, TV	Rank^{#}	Opponent^{#}	Result	Record	High points	High rebounds	High assists	Site (attendance) city, state
Non-conference regular season
Nov 11, 2017*; 3:00 pm, BSN		Stephen F. Austin	L 61–74	0–1	21 – Walton	8 – Montague	4 – Geter	Willett Hall (1,412); Farmville, VA
Nov 14, 2017*; 7:00 pm, BSN		Columbia	L 77–87	0–2	32 – Walton	10 – Ashe	6 – Ashe	Willett Hall (1,522); Farmville, VA
Nov 18, 2017*; 3:00 pm, BSN		Saint Francis (PA)	L 56–83	0–3	15 – Walton	9 – Geter	5 – Glover	Willett Hall (1,317); Farmville, VA
Nov 21, 2017*; 7:30 pm, ESPN3		at UNC Greensboro; UNCG Tournament	L 40–71	0–4	17 – Ashe	5 – Tied	2 – Ashe	Greensboro Coliseum (1,635); Greensboro, NC
Nov 22, 2017*; 3:00 pm		vs. Delaware; UNCG Tournament	L 57–65	0–5	20 – Ashe	10 – Glover	2 – 3 tied	Fleming Gymnasium (93); Greensboro, NC
Nov 26, 2017*; 3:00 pm, BSN		North Carolina Wesleyan	W 107–78	1–5	31 – Ashe	9 – Shields	8 – Ashe	Willett Hall; Farmville, VA
Nov 29, 2017*; 7:00 pm, BSN		Bluefield State	W 84–59	2–5	29 – Walton	7 – 3 tied	3 – Glover	Willett Hall (1,128); Farmville, VA
Dec 2, 2017*; 3:00 pm, BSN		Fayetteville State	W 61–52	3–5	11 – Shields	13 – Shields	5 – Walton	Willett Hall (712); Farmville, VA
Dec 9, 2017*; 1:00 pm		at VMI	L 70–81	3–6	21 – Ashe	11 – Shields	3 – Glover	Cameron Hall (2,642); Lexington, VA
Dec 13, 2017*; 8:00 pm, BTN		at Illinois	L 45–92	3–7	10 – Smith	6 – Shields	3 – Tied	State Farm Center (12,387); Champaign, IL
Dec 16, 2017*; 2:00 pm, BSN		Cornell	L 62–69	3–8	13 – Chapman	9 – Tied	3 – Ashe	Willett Hall (215); Farmville, VA
Dec 19, 2017*; 9:00 pm, P12N		at No. 3 Arizona State	W 95–61	3–9	14 – Ashe	8 – Geter	4 – Geter	Wells Fargo Arena (9,308); Tempe, AZ
Dec 21, 2017*; 8:00 pm, ESPN3		at Grand Canyon	L 56–86	3–10	13 – Tied	6 – Ashe	2 – Tied	GCU Arena (7,006); Phoenix, AZ
Big South regular season
Dec 30, 2017; 12:30 pm, BSN		at Charleston Southern	L 43–84	3–11 (0–1)	15 – Smith	7 – Smith	2 – Tied	CSU Field House (426); North Charleston, SC
Jan 3, 2018; 7:00 pm, BSN		Presbyterian	L 65–78	3–12 (0–2)	19 – Walton	7 – Tied	4 – Ashe	Willett Hall (473); Farmville, VA
Jan 6, 2018; 2:00 pm, BSN		Gardner–Webb	W 79–73	4–12 (1–2)	21 – Ashe	13 – Ashe	5 – Ashe	Willett Hall (1,373); Farmville, VA
Jan 9, 2018; 7:00 pm, BSN		at UNC Asheville	L 80–90	4–13 (1–3)	19 – Glover	4 – Geter	6 – Ashe	Kimmel Arena (1,312); Asheville, NC
Jan 12, 2018; 7:00 pm, BSN		at Liberty	W 58–51	5–13 (2–3)	22 – Walton	8 – Geter	4 – Tied	Vines Center (1,989); Lynchburg, VA
Jan 15, 2018; 7:00 pm, BSN		Campbell	W 76–62	6–13 (3–3)	27 – Walton	14 – Geter	4 – Geter	Willett Hall (1,407); Farmville, VA
Jan 18, 2018; 7:00 pm, BSN		at Radford	L 63–70	6–14 (3–4)	16 – Walton	8 – Geter	3 – Tied	Dedmon Center (1,251); Radford, VA
Jan 21, 2018; 3:00 pm, BSN		High Point	L 55–75	6–15 (3–5)	14 – Walton	10 – Geter	2 – Ashe	Willett Hall (1,675); Farmville, VA
Jan 24, 2018; 7:00 pm, BSN		Winthrop	L 78–95	6–16 (3–6)	24 – Ashe	10 – Geter	5 – Geter	Willett Hall (1,737); Farmville, VA
Jan 27, 2018; 7:00 pm, BSN		at Gardner–Webb	L 57–60	6–17 (3–7)	16 – Walton	11 – Geter	3 – Walton	Paul Porter Arena (908); Boiling Springs, NC
Feb 1, 2018; 7:00 pm, BSN		at Presbyterian	L 62–67	6–18 (3–8)	16 – Ashe	9 – Glover	4 – Walton	Templeton Center (264); Clinton, SC
Feb 3, 2018; 2:00 pm, BSN		Liberty	L 55–67	6–19 (3–9)	20 – Walton	6 – Tied	3 – Tied	Willett Hall (1,807); Farmville, VA
Feb 7, 2018; 7:00 pm, BSN		UNC Asheville	L 73–78	6–20 (3–10)	19 – Geter	7 – Franklin	5 – Walton	Willett Hall (1,473); Farmville, VA
Feb 10, 2018; 4:00 pm, BSN		at Campbell	L 54–88	6–21 (3–11)	25 – Clemons	8 – Clemons	8 – Eudy	Gore Arena (2,033); Buies Creek, NC
Feb 15, 2018; 7:00 pm, BSN		Charleston Southern	L 65–77	6–22 (3–12)	24 – Walton	14 – Geter	3 – Glover	Willett Hall (1,173); Farmville, VA
Feb 18, 2018; 2:00 pm, BSN		at Winthrop	L 64–79	6–23 (3–13)	21 – Ashe	9 – Geter	4 – Geter	Winthrop Coliseum (2,331); Rock Hill, SC
Feb 22, 2018; 7:00 pm, BSN		at High Point	L 56–75	6–24 (3–14)	12 – Geter	8 – Geter	2 – 3 tied	Millis Center (1,008); High Point, NC
Feb 24, 2018; 3:00 pm, BSN		Radford	L 47–70	6–25 (3–15)	10 – Ashe	7 – Geter	2 – Ashe	Willett Hall (1,384); Farmville, VA
Big South Conference tournament
Feb 27, 2018; 7:00 pm, BSN	(10)	at (7) High Point; First round	W 68–55	7–25	14 – Tied	6 – Geter	4 – Walton	Millis Center (813); High Point, NC
Mar 1, 2018; 1:00 pm, ESPN3	(10)	vs. (2) Radford; Quarterfinals	L 53–59	7–26	15 – Tied	8 – Glover	3 – Walton	Kimmel Arena (1,159); Asheville, NC
*Non-conference game. ^{#}Rankings from AP Poll. (#) Tournament seedings in parentheses. All times are in Eastern Time..
