= 2017–18 Presbyterian Blue Hose men's basketball team =

American college basketball season

2017–18 Presbyterian Blue Hose men's basketball
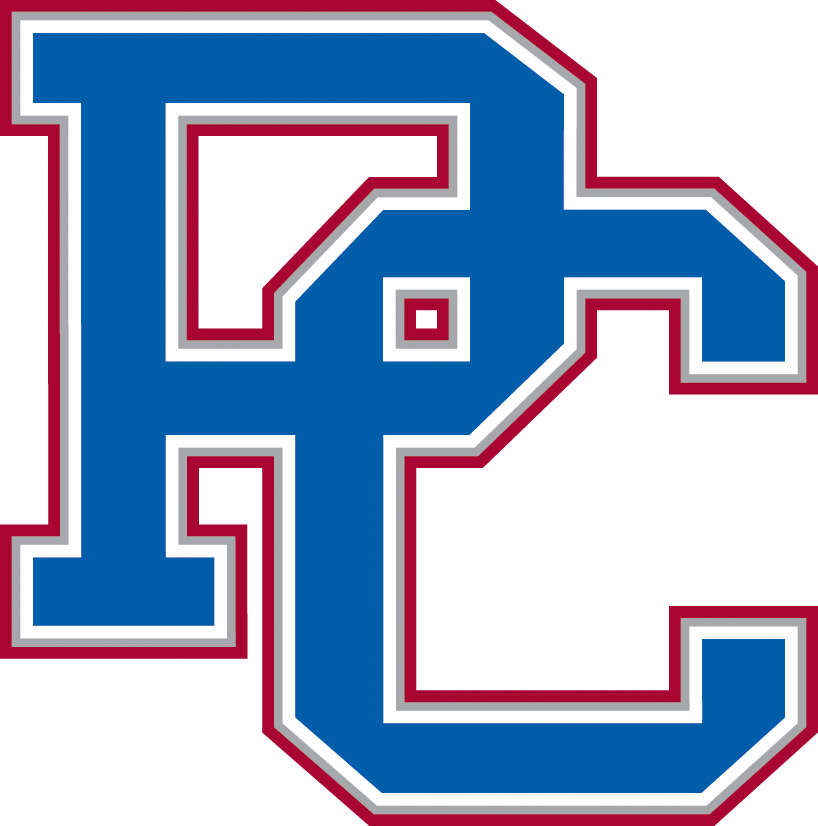
- Conference: Big South Conference
- Record: 11–21 (4–14 Big South)
- Head coach: Dustin Kerns (1st season)
- Assistant coaches: Tommy Brown; Frank Young; Patrick Moynihan
- Home arena: Templeton Physical Education Center

2017–18 Big South men's basketball standings
	Conf.				Overall
Team	W		L	PCT	W		L	PCT
UNC Asheville	13	–	5	.722	21	–	13	.618
Radford †	12	–	6	.667	23	–	13	.639
Winthrop	12	–	6	.667	19	–	12	.613
Campbell	10	–	8	.556	18	–	16	.529
Liberty	9	–	9	.500	22	–	15	.595
Charleston Southern	9	–	9	.500	15	–	16	.484
High Point	9	–	9	.500	14	–	16	.467
Gardner–Webb	9	–	9	.500	14	–	18	.438
Presbyterian	4	–	14	.222	11	–	21	.344
Longwood	3	–	15	.167	7	–	26	.212
† 2018 Big South tournament winner

The 2017–18 Presbyterian Blue Hose men's basketball team represented Presbyterian College during the 2017–18 NCAA Division I men's basketball season. The Blue Hose, led by first-year head coach Dustin Kerns, played their home games at the Templeton Physical Education Center in Clinton, South Carolina as members of the Big South Conference. They finished the season 11–21, 4–14 in Big South play to finish in ninth place. They lost in the first round of the Big South tournament to Charleston Southern.

== Previous season ==
The Blue Hose finished the season 5–25, 1–17 in Big South play to finish in last place. They lost in the first round of the Big South tournament to Campbell.

Head coach Gregg Nibert resigned on April 12, 2017 after 28 seasons at Presbyterian, and was replaced by Wofford assistant Dustin Kerns on May 22.

== Roster ==
2017–18 Presbyterian Blue Hose men's basketball team
Players
Coaches

Pos.	#	Name	Height	Weight	Year	Hometown
G	0	Jaron Withers	6 ft 4 in (1.93 m)	200 lb (91 kg)	Sr	Winston-Salem, North Carolina
G	2	Montenia Nelson	6 ft 1 in (1.85 m)	—	Jr	Kenosha, Wisconsin
G	3	Romeo Crouch	6 ft 3 in (1.91 m)	175 lb (79 kg)	Fr	Titusville, Florida
F	4	Ben Drake	6 ft 8 in (2.03 m)	225 lb (102 kg)	Jr	Kennesaw, Georgia
G	5	Davon Bell	5 ft 10 in (1.78 m)	175 lb (79 kg)	RS Jr	Charlotte, North Carolina
G	10	Tymori Tribble	5 ft 9 in (1.75 m)	150 lb (68 kg)	RS Fr	Clinton, South Carolina
C	11	Armel TeTe	6 ft 9 in (2.06 m)	210 lb (95 kg)	So	Fayetteville, North Carolina
C	12	Stephen Osu	6 ft 9 in (2.06 m)	255 lb (116 kg)	Sr	Herndon, Virginia
G	14	Reggie Dillard	6 ft 4 in (1.93 m)	222 lb (101 kg)	RS Sr	Greensboro, North Carolina
F	15	Francois Lewis	6 ft 9 in (2.06 m)	230 lb (104 kg)	RS Jr	Orlando, Florida
G	20	Brent Carraway	5 ft 8 in (1.73 m)	150 lb (68 kg)	So	Sumter, South Carolina
G	21	Jo'Vontae Millner	6 ft 6 in (1.98 m)	205 lb (93 kg)	So	Burlington, North Carolina
F	23	Ruben Arroyo	6 ft 8 in (2.03 m)	215 lb (98 kg)	Sr	Patillas, Puerto Rico
G	25	JC Younger	6 ft 4 in (1.93 m)	200 lb (91 kg)	So	Mandeville, Louisiana
G	30	Jamie Baker	5 ft 11 in (1.8 m)	155 lb (70 kg)	Fr	Concord, North Carolina
G	32	Ethan Kay	6 ft 0 in (1.83 m)	185 lb (84 kg)	Jr	Orange Park, Florida

Head coach

- Dustin Kerns (Clemson)

Assistant coach(es)

- Tommy Brown (Covenant)
- Frank Young (West Virginia)
- Patrick Moynihan (North Georgia)

Legend

- (C) Team captain
- (S) Suspended
- (I) Ineligible
- (W) Walk-on
- Injured
- Current redshirt

Roster
Last update: October 25, 2017

== Schedule and results ==
Date time, TV	Rank^{#}	Opponent^{#}	Result	Record	Site (attendance) city, state
Non-conference regular season
Nov 10, 2017*; 7:00 pm, SECN+		at Tennessee; Battle 4 Atlantis campus-site game	L 53–88	0–1	Thompson–Boling Arena (15,047); Knoxville, TN
Nov 11, 2017*; 7:00 pm		Johnson (TN)	W 107–87	1–1	Templeton Center (208); Clinton, SC
Nov 16, 2017*; 7:00 pm, ACCN Extra		at NC State; Battle 4 Atlantis campus-site game	L 68–86	1–2	PNC Arena (13,422); Raleigh, NC
Nov 18, 2017*; 1:00 pm, ESPN3		at VMI	L 58–78	1–3	Cameron Hall (765); Lexington, VA
Nov 20, 2017*; 7:00 pm		at Charlotte	L 74–83	1–4	Halton Arena (3,260); Charlotte, NC
Nov 23, 2017*; 2:00 pm, ESPN3		vs. Nicholls State; Battle 4 Atlantis Mainland semifinals	L 64–76	1–5	Retriever Activities Center (146); Catonsville, MD
Nov 24, 2017*; 12:00 pm, ESPN3		vs. Chicago State; Battle 4 Atlantis Mainland 3rd place game	W 75–73	2–5	Retriever Activities Center (113); Catonsville, MD
Nov 28, 2017*; 7:00 pm		UNC Greensboro	W 74–72	3–5	Templeton Center (230); Clinton, SC
Dec 2, 2017*; 4:00 pm		North Carolina A&T	W 73–70	4–5	Templeton Center (278); Clinton, SC
Dec 5, 2017*; 7:00 pm		South Carolina State	W 88–77	5–5	Templeton Center (459); Clinton, SC
Dec 14, 2017*; 7:00 pm		Toccoa Falls	W 104–35	6–5	Templeton Center (230); Clinton, SC
Dec 19, 2017*; 7:00 pm, ACCN Extra		at Virginia Tech	L 55–63	6–6	Cassell Coliseum (5,043); Blacksburg, VA
Dec 21, 2017*; 2:00 pm		Piedmont	W 77–60	7–6	Templeton Center (248); Clinton, SC
Big South regular season
Dec 30, 2017; 4:00 pm		Radford	L 62–78	7–7 (0–1)	Templeton Center (301); Clinton, SC
Jan 3, 2018; 7:00 pm		at Longwood	W 78–65	8–7 (1–1)	Willett Hall (473); Farmville, VA
Jan 6, 2018; 4:00 pm		at Liberty	L 48–60	8–8 (1–2)	Vines Center (2,216); Lynchburg, VA
Jan 9, 2018; 7:00 pm		Campbell	L 79–83	8–9 (1–3)	Templeton Center (429); Clinton, SC
Jan 12, 2018; 4:00 pm		UNC Asheville	L 56–76	8–10 (1–4)	Templeton Center (462); Clinton, SC
Jan 15, 2018; 7:00 pm		at High Point	L 49–73	8–11 (1–5)	Millis Athletic Center (1,134); High Point, NC
Jan 18, 2018; 7:00 pm		at Gardner–Webb	L 53–61	8–12 (1–6)	Paul Porter Arena (1,269); Boiling Springs, NC
Jan 21, 2018; 4:00 pm		Winthrop	L 68–81	8–13 (1–7)	Templeton Center (433); Clinton, SC
Jan 24, 2018; 7:30 pm		at Charleston Southern	W 57–49	9–13 (2–7)	CSU Field House (686); North Charleston, SC
Jan 27, 2018; 4:00 pm		Liberty	L 66–81	9–14 (2–8)	Templeton Center (493); Clinton, SC
Feb 1, 2018; 7:00 pm		Longwood	W 67–62	10–14 (3–8)	Templeton Center (264); Clinton, SC
Feb 3, 2018; 4:30 pm		at UNC Asheville	L 61–75	10–15 (3–9)	Kimmel Arena (2,608); Asheville, NC
Feb 7, 2018; 7:00 pm, ESPN3		at Winthrop	L 49–63	10–16 (3–10)	Winthrop Coliseum (655); Rock Hill, SC
Feb 10, 2018; 4:00 pm		Charleston Southern	L 54–64	10–17 (3–11)	Templeton Center (1,168); Clinton, SC
Feb 15, 2018; 7:00 pm		High Point	W 69–62	11–17 (4–11)	Templeton Center (259); Clinton, SC
Feb 18, 2018; 3:00 pm		at Radford	L 68–74 ^{OT}	11–18 (4–12)	Dedmon Center (1,184); Radford, VA
Feb 22, 2018; 7:00 pm		Gardner–Webb	L 63–78	11–19 (4–13)	Templeton Center (353); Clinton, SC
Feb 24, 2018; 4:30 pm		at Campbell	L 56–72	11–20 (4–14)	Gore Arena (2,086); Buies Creek, NC
Big South tournament
Feb 27, 2018; 7:00 pm, BSN	(9)	at (8) Charleston Southern; First round	L 51–68	11–21	CSU Field House (810); North Charleston, SC
*Non-conference game. ^{#}Rankings from AP Poll. (#) Tournament seedings in parentheses. All times are in Eastern Time Source.
