= 2017–18 High Point Panthers men's basketball team =

American college basketball season

2017–18 High Point Panthers men's basketball
- Conference: Big South Conference
- Record: 14–16 (9–9 Big South)
- Head coach: Scott Cherry (9th season)
- Assistant coaches: Ahmad Dorsett; Trey Brown; Eric Grabriel
- Home arena: Millis Athletic Center

2017–18 Big South men's basketball standings
	Conf.				Overall
Team	W		L	PCT	W		L	PCT
UNC Asheville	13	–	5	.722	21	–	13	.618
Radford †	12	–	6	.667	23	–	13	.639
Winthrop	12	–	6	.667	19	–	12	.613
Campbell	10	–	8	.556	18	–	16	.529
Liberty	9	–	9	.500	22	–	15	.595
Charleston Southern	9	–	9	.500	15	–	16	.484
High Point	9	–	9	.500	14	–	16	.467
Gardner–Webb	9	–	9	.500	14	–	18	.438
Presbyterian	4	–	14	.222	11	–	21	.344
Longwood	3	–	15	.167	7	–	26	.212
† 2018 Big South tournament winner

The 2017–18 High Point Panthers men's basketball team represented High Point University during the 2017–18 NCAA Division I men's basketball season. The Panthers, led by ninth-year head coach Scott Cherry, played their home games at the Millis Athletic Convocation Center as members of the Big South Conference. They finished the season 14–16, 9–9 in Big South play to finish in a four-way tie for fifth place. As a 7 seed, they lost to Longwood in the first round of the Big South tournament.

On March 7, 2018, head coach Scott Cherry and the school mutually agreed to part ways. On March 26, it was reported that the school had hired High Point alumnus Tubby Smith as head coach.

== Previous season ==
The Panthers finished the season 15–16, 9–9 in Big South play to finish in fifth place. They lost in the quarterfinals of the Big South tournament to Gardner–Webb.

== Roster ==
2017–18 High Point Panthers men's basketball team
Players
Coaches

Pos.	#	Name	Height	Weight	Year	Hometown
G	1	Brandonn Kamga	6 ft 5 in (1.96 m)	217 lb (98 kg)	RS So	Reston, Virginia
G	2	Austin White	6 ft 0 in (1.83 m)	190 lb (86 kg)	Sr	South Orange, New Jersey
G	3	Jamal Wright	5 ft 11 in (1.8 m)	175 lb (79 kg)	So	Upper Marlboro, Maryland
G	4	Tim Cameron	6 ft 4 in (1.93 m)	180 lb (82 kg)	RS Fr	Norcross, Georgia
F	5	Justyn Mutts	6 ft 7 in (2.01 m)	220 lb (100 kg)	Fr	Millville, New Jersey
G	11	Denny Slay	5 ft 11 in (1.8 m)	185 lb (84 kg)	Fr	Woodbridge, Virginia
G	13	Jahaad Proctor	6 ft 3 in (1.91 m)	205 lb (93 kg)	RS So	Harrisburg, Pennsylvania
F	14	Luke Vargo	6 ft 7 in (2.01 m)	205 lb (93 kg)	So	Dublin, Ohio
F	15	Cliff Thomas Jr.	6 ft 8 in (2.03 m)	215 lb (98 kg)	So	Montgomery, Alabama
G	22	Andre Fox	6 ft 4 in (1.93 m)	185 lb (84 kg)	Jr	Greenbelt, Maryland
G/F	25	Ricky Madison	6 ft 7 in (2.01 m)	215 lb (98 kg)	Jr	Norcross, Georgia
C	33	Sam Berlin	6 ft 10 in (2.08 m)	250 lb (113 kg)	RS Jr	Manassas, Virginia
F	33	Miles Bowman Jr.	6 ft 6 in (1.98 m)	220 lb (100 kg)	RS Sr	Winston-Salem, North Carolina
F	34	Jordan Whitehead	6 ft 5 in (1.96 m)	235 lb (107 kg)	Sr	Morris Plains, New Jersey
F	35	Caden Sanchez	6 ft 8 in (2.03 m)	260 lb (118 kg)	Fr	Columbus, Ohio
G	45	Dexter Gooding	6 ft 4 in (1.93 m)	180 lb (82 kg)	Jr	Daytona Beach, Florida

Head coach

- Scott Cherry (North Carolina)

Assistant coach(es)

- Ahmad Dorsett (George Mason)
- Trey Brown (South Carolina)
- Eric Gabriel (West Liberty)

Legend

- (C) Team captain
- (S) Suspended
- (I) Ineligible
- (W) Walk-on
- Injured
- Current redshirt

Roster
Last update: October 25, 2017

== Schedule and results ==
Date time, TV	Rank^{#}	Opponent^{#}	Result	Record	Site (attendance) city, state
Exhibition
Nov 5, 2017*; 2:00 pm		Averett	W 90–66		Millis Center (982); High Point, NC
Non-conference regular season
Nov 10, 2017*; 8:00 pm		William & Mary	W 100–66	1–0	Millis Center (1,173); High Point, NC
Nov 14, 2017*; 7:00 pm, SECN+		at Tennessee	L 53–84	1–1	Thompson–Boling Arena (12,343); Knoxville, TN
Nov 18, 2017*; 2:00 pm		The Citadel	L 77–79	1–2	Millis Center (1,147); High Point, NC
Nov 21, 2017*; 8:00 pm		Methodist	W 99–63	2–2	Millis Center (1,136); High Point, NC
Nov 24, 2017*; 7:00 pm		at Charlotte	L 67–70	2–3	Halton Arena (3,256); Charlotte, NC
Nov 28, 2017*; 7:00 pm, ACCN Extra		at Pittsburgh	L 63–71	2–4	Petersen Events Center (2,399); Pittsburgh, PA
Dec 1, 2017*; 7:00 pm		Johnson & Wales (NC)	W 90–54	3–4	Millis Center (1,243); High Point, NC
Dec 4, 2017*; 7:00 pm		at College of Charleston	L 58–70	3–5	TD Arena (3,223); Charleston, SC
Dec 10, 2017*; 2:00 pm		Toccoa Falls	W 110–39	4–5	Millis Center (1,104); High Point, NC
Dec 17, 2017*; 2:00 pm		vs. Wofford; Mountain Invitational	L 57–70	4–6	U.S. Cellular Center (1,423); Asheville, NC
Dec 19, 2017*; 7:00 pm, ESPN3		at Western Carolina	W 72–61	5–6	Ramsey Center (1,011); Cullowhee, NC
Big South regular season
Dec 30, 2017; 2:00 pm		at Winthrop	L 60–76	5–7 (0–1)	Winthrop Coliseum (1,168); Rock Hill, SC
Jan 3, 2018; 7:00 pm		UNC Asheville	W 84–74	6–7 (1–1)	Millis Center (1,121); High Point, NC
Jan 6, 2018; 7:00 pm		Charleston Southern	W 80–59	7–7 (2–1)	Millis Center (1,521); High Point, NC
Jan 9, 2018; 7:00 pm		at Gardner–Webb	L 45–62	7–8 (2–2)	Paul Porter Arena (1,105); Boiling Springs, NC
Jan 12, 2018; 7:00 pm		at Campbell	L 64–65	7–9 (2–3)	Gore Arena (1,808); Buies Creek, NC
Jan 15, 2018; 7:00 pm		Presbyterian	W 73–49	8–9 (3–3)	Millis Center (1,134); High Point, NC
Jan 18, 2018; 7:00 pm		Liberty	W 71–60	9–9 (4–3)	Millis Center (1,214); High Point, NC
Jan 21, 2018; 3:00 pm		at Longwood	W 75–55	10–9 (5–3)	Willett Hall (1,675); Farmville, VA
Jan 24, 2018; 7:00 pm		Radford	L 76–78 ^{OT}	10–10 (5–4)	Millis Center (894); High Point, NC
Jan 27, 2018; 4:30 pm, ESPN3		at UNC Asheville	L 77–84	10–11 (5–5)	Kimmel Arena (2,104); Asheville, NC
Feb 1, 2018; 7:30 pm		at Charleston Southern	L 74–83	10–12 (5–6)	CSU Field House (610); North Charleston, SC
Feb 3, 2018; 7:00 pm, ESPN3		Campbell	W 67–56	11–12 (6–6)	Millis Center (1,750); High Point, NC
Feb 7, 2018; 7:00 pm		at Radford	W 61–60	12–12 (7–6)	Dedmon Center (1,033); Radford, VA
Feb 10, 2018; 7:00 pm, Stadium		Winthrop	L 70–82	12–13 (7–7)	Millis Center (1,342); High Point, NC
Feb 15, 2018; 7:00 pm		at Presbyterian	L 62–69	12–14 (7–8)	Templeton Center (259); Clinton, SC
Feb 18, 2018; 2:00 pm		Gardner–Webb	W 66–65	13–14 (8–8)	Millis Center (1,127); High Point, NC
Feb 22, 2018; 7:00 pm		Longwood	W 75–56	14–14 (9–8)	Millis Center (1,008); High Point, NC
Feb 24, 2018; 2:00 pm, ESPN3		at Liberty	L 45–65	14–15 (9–9)	Vines Center (3,517); Lynchburg, VA
Big South tournament
Feb 27, 2018; 7:00 pm	(7)	(10) Longwood; First round	L 55–68	14–16	Millis Center (813); High Point, NC
*Non-conference game. (#) Tournament seedings in parentheses. All times are in Eastern Time Source.
