= 2018 Big South Conference men's basketball tournament =

- Classification: Division I
- Season: 2017–18
- Teams: 10
- Site: Campus sites (first round); Kimmel Arena (Qrts and Semis); Dedmon Center (championship Game)
- Champions: Radford (3rd title)
- Winning coach: Mike Jones (1st title)
- MVP: Carlik Jones (Radford)
- Television: BSN, ESPN3, ESPN

2017–18 Big South men's basketball standings
	Conf.				Overall
Team	W		L	PCT	W		L	PCT
UNC Asheville	13	–	5	.722	21	–	13	.618
Radford †	12	–	6	.667	23	–	13	.639
Winthrop	12	–	6	.667	19	–	12	.613
Campbell	10	–	8	.556	18	–	16	.529
Liberty	9	–	9	.500	22	–	15	.595
Charleston Southern	9	–	9	.500	15	–	16	.484
High Point	9	–	9	.500	14	–	16	.467
Gardner–Webb	9	–	9	.500	14	–	18	.438
Presbyterian	4	–	14	.222	11	–	21	.344
Longwood	3	–	15	.167	7	–	26	.212
† 2018 Big South tournament winner

The 2018 Big South men's basketball tournament was the postseason men's basketball tournament that ended the 2017–18 season of the Big South Conference. It was held from February 27 through March 4, 2018 at various campus sites. No. 2 seed Radford defeated No. 5 seed Liberty in the championship game to win the tournament and receive the conference's automatic bid to the NCAA tournament.

== Sites ==
The first round was played at campus sites, at the home of the higher seed. The quarterfinals and semifinals were played at Kimmel Arena in Asheville, North Carolina, home of regular-season champion UNC Asheville. The championship game was held at the home arena of the higher surviving seed among the two finalists—in this case Radford's home of the Dedmon Center in Radford, Virginia.

== Seeds ==
All 10 conference teams were eligible for the tournament. The top six teams received a first-round bye. Teams were seeded by record within the conference, with a tiebreaker system to seed teams with identical conference records.

Seed	School	Conference	Overall	Tiebreaker 1	Tiebreaker 2	Tiebreaker 3	Tiebreaker 4	Tiebreaker 5
1	UNC Asheville	13–5	20–11					
2	Radford	12–6	19–12	RPI: 140				
3	Winthrop	12–6	18–11	RPI: 170				
4	Campbell	10–8	16–14					
5	Liberty	9–9	18–13	3–3 vs GW/HP/CharSo	1–1 vs UNCA	2–2 vs Win/Rad		
6	Gardner–Webb	9–9	14–17	3–3 vs Lib/HP/CharSo	1–1 vs UNCA	1–3 vs Win/Rad	1–1 vs Camp	2–0 vs Pres
7	High Point	9–9	14–15	3–3 vs Lib/GW/CharSo	1–1 vs UNCA	1–3 vs Win/Rad	1–1 vs Camp	1–1 vs Pres
8	Charleston Southern	9–9	14–15	3–3 vs Lib/GW/HP	0–2 vs UNCA			
9	Presbyterian	4–14	11–20					
10	Longwood	3–15	6–25					

== Schedule ==
Game	Time*	MatchupNo.	Score	Television
First round - Tuesday, February 27 Campus sites
1	7:00 pm	No. 10 Longwood at No. 7 High Point	68–55	BSN
2	7:00 pm	No. 9 Presbyterian at No. 8 Charleston Southern	51–68	BSN
Quarterfinals - Thursday, March 1 at Kimmel Arena; Asheville, NC
3	1:00 pm	No. 10 Longwood vs. No. 2 Radford	53–59	ESPN3
4	3:30 pm	No. 6 Gardner–Webb vs. No. 3 Winthrop	68–72	ESPN3
5	7:00 pm	No. 8 Charleston Southern vs. No. 1 UNC Asheville	66–71	ESPN3
6	9:30 pm	No. 5 Liberty vs. No. 4 Campbell	73–59	ESPN3
Semifinals - Friday, March 2 at Kimmel Arena; Asheville, NC
7	6:00 pm	No. 3 Winthrop vs. No. 2 Radford	52–61	ESPN3
8	8:30 pm	No. 5 Liberty vs. No. 1 UNC Asheville	69–64	ESPN3
Championship - Sunday, March 4 at Dedmon Center; Radford, VA
9	1:00 pm	No. 5 Liberty at No. 2 Radford	52–55	ESPN
*Game times in ET. Rankings denote tournament seeding.

== Bracket ==
First round Tuesday, February 27
8	Charleston Southern	68
9	Presbyterian	51
7	High Point	55
10	Longwood	68

Quarterfinals; Thursday, March 1
1	UNC Asheville	71
8	Charleston Southern	66
4	Campbell	59
5	Liberty	73
2	Radford	59
10	Longwood	53
3	Winthrop	72
6	Gardner–Webb	68

Semifinals; Friday, March 2
1	UNC Asheville	64
5	Liberty	69
2	Radford	61
3	Winthrop	52

Championship; Sunday, March 4
5	Liberty	52
2	Radford	55
