= 2017–18 Campbell Fighting Camels men's basketball team =

American college basketball season

2017–18 Campbell Fighting Camels men's basketball
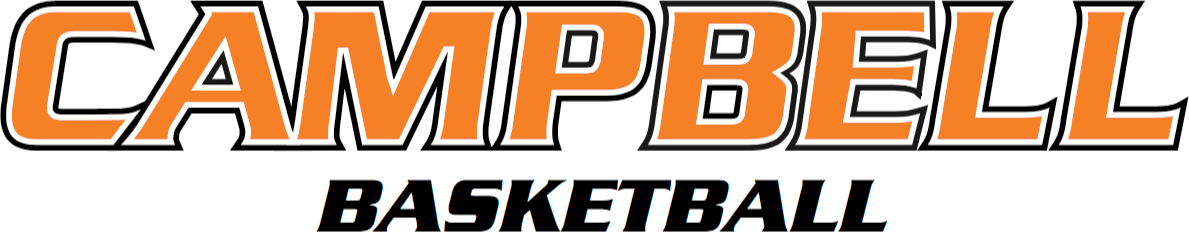

CBI, Semifinals
- Conference: Big South Conference
- Record: 18–16 (10–8 Big South)
- Head coach: Kevin McGeehan (5th season)
- Assistant coaches: Peter Thomas; Kevin Smith; Kenneth White
- Home arena: Gore Arena

2017–18 Big South men's basketball standings
	Conf.				Overall
Team	W		L	PCT	W		L	PCT
UNC Asheville	13	–	5	.722	21	–	13	.618
Radford †	12	–	6	.667	23	–	13	.639
Winthrop	12	–	6	.667	19	–	12	.613
Campbell	10	–	8	.556	18	–	16	.529
Liberty	9	–	9	.500	22	–	15	.595
Charleston Southern	9	–	9	.500	15	–	16	.484
High Point	9	–	9	.500	14	–	16	.467
Gardner–Webb	9	–	9	.500	14	–	18	.438
Presbyterian	4	–	14	.222	11	–	21	.344
Longwood	3	–	15	.167	7	–	26	.212
† 2018 Big South tournament winner

The 2017–18 Campbell Fighting Camels men's basketball team represented Campbell University during the 2017–18 NCAA Division I men's basketball season. The Fighting Camels were led by fifth-year head coach Kevin McGeehan and played their home games at Gore Arena in Buies Creek, North Carolina as members of the Big South Conference. They finished the season 18–16, 10–8 in Big South play to finish in fourth place. They lost to Liberty in the quarterfinals of the Big South tournament. They were invited to the College Basketball Invitational where they defeated Miami (OH) and New Orleans before losing in the semifinals to San Francisco.

== Previous season ==
The Fighting Camels finished the season 19–18, 7–11 in Big South play to finish in a tie for seventh place. Due to tiebreakers, they received the No. 7 seed in the Big South tournament, where they defeated Presbyterian, UNC Asheville, and Radford to advance to the championship game where they lost to Winthrop. They received an invitation to the CollegeInsider.com Tournament where they defeated Houston Baptist and UT Martin before losing in the quarterfinals to Furman.

== Roster ==
2017–18 Campbell Fighting Camels men's basketball team
Players
Coaches

Pos.	#	Name	Height	Weight	Year	Hometown
F	1	Damontez Oliver	6 ft 6 in (1.98 m)	220 lb (100 kg)	So	Glen Allen, Virginia
G	2	Ja'Cor Nelson	6 ft 3 in (1.91 m)	185 lb (84 kg)	Fr	Hopkins, South Carolina
G	3	Chris Clemons	5 ft 9 in (1.75 m)	180 lb (82 kg)	Jr	Raleigh, North Carolina
F	5	Austin Burnette	6 ft 7 in (2.01 m)	220 lb (100 kg)	So	Raleigh, North Carolina
G	10	Nick Parker	6 ft 3 in (1.91 m)	185 lb (84 kg)	Sr	Dunn, North Carolina
G	11	Jordan Whitfield	6 ft 1 in (1.85 m)	175 lb (79 kg)	Fr	Raleigh, North Carolina
F	12	Jon Ander Cuadra	6 ft 8 in (2.03 m)	210 lb (95 kg)	Jr	Vitoria-Gasteiz, Spain
F	14	Nick Greely	6 ft 7 in (2.01 m)	235 lb (107 kg)	RS Fr	Fairmont, West Virginia
F	15	Mogga Lado	6 ft 8 in (2.03 m)	215 lb (98 kg)	Sr	Nampa, Idaho
F	21	Brooks Cluxton	6 ft 8 in (2.03 m)	190 lb (86 kg)	Fr	Oviedo, Florida
G	22	Cory Gensler	6 ft 4 in (1.93 m)	190 lb (86 kg)	So	Cary, North Carolina
F	25	Andrew Eudy	6 ft 7 in (2.01 m)	210 lb (95 kg)	Jr	Lebanon, Pennsylvania
G	30	Wyatt Self	6 ft 2 in (1.88 m)	175 lb (79 kg)	So	Davidson, North Carolina
F	32	Shane Whitfield	6 ft 7 in (2.01 m)	210 lb (95 kg)	RS Sr	Raleigh, North Carolina
G	34	Marcus Burk	6 ft 3 in (1.91 m)	205 lb (93 kg)	So	Indianapolis, Indiana

Head coach

- Kevin McGeehan (Gettysburg)

Assistant coach(es)

- Peter Thomas (Richmond)
- Kevin Smith (Richmond)
- Kenneth White (North Carolina)

Legend

- (C) Team captain
- (S) Suspended
- (I) Ineligible
- (W) Walk-on
- Injured
- Current redshirt

Roster
Last update: October 24, 2017

== Schedule and results ==
Date time, TV	Rank^{#}	Opponent^{#}	Result	Record	Site (attendance) city, state
Non-conference regular season
Nov 10, 2017*; 4:00 pm, BTN+		at Penn State	L 75–86	0–1	Bryce Jordan Center; State College, PA
Nov 13, 2017*; 7:00 pm		Columbia International	W 108–44	1–1	Gore Arena (1,245); Buies Creek, NC
Nov 18, 2017*; 7:00 pm		at UNC Wilmington	L 84–88	1–2	Trask Coliseum (4,415); Wilmington, NC
Nov 20, 2017*; 7:00 pm		Johnson & Wales (NC)	W 98–53	2–2	Gore Arena (1,147); Buies Creek, NC
Nov 24, 2017*; 2:00 pm		Abilene Christian; Creek Classic	L 80–85 ^{OT}	2–3	Gore Arena (1,083); Buies Creek, NC
Nov 25, 2017*; 2:00 pm		Bowling Green; Creek Classic	L 72–78	2–4	Gore Arena (1,208); Buies Creek, NC
Nov 26, 2017*; 4:00 pm		USC Upstate; Creek Classic	W 93–74	3–4	Gore Arena (1,019); Buies Creek, NC
Nov 30, 2017*; 7:00 pm, ESPN3		at Stetson	W 85–78	4–4	Edmunds Center (460); DeLand, FL
Dec 4, 2017*; 7:00 pm, ESPN3		at East Carolina	L 66–69	4–5	Williams Arena at Minges Coliseum (2,980); Greenville, NC
Dec 14, 2017*; 7:00 pm		The Citadel	W 87–77	5–5	Gore Arena (1,131); Buies Creek, NC
Dec 19, 2017*; 8:00 pm		at Saint Louis	L 66–74	5–6	Chaifetz Arena (5,017); St. Louis, MO
Dec 22, 2017*; 2:00 pm		Allen	W 91–62	6–6	Gore Arena (1,062); Buies Creek, NC
Big South regular season
Dec 30, 2017; 2:00 pm		at UNC Asheville	L 79–85	6–7 (0–1)	Kimmel Arena (1,598); Asheville, NC
Jan 3, 2018; 7:00 pm		Gardner–Webb	L 80–82 ^{OT}	6–8 (0–2)	Gore Arena (922); Buies Creek, NC
Jan 6, 2018; 2:00 pm		Winthrop	W 88–77	7–8 (1–2)	Gore Arena (1,620); Buies Creek, NC
Jan 9, 2018; 7:00 pm		at Presbyterian	W 83–79	8–8 (2–2)	Templeton Center (429); Clinton, SC
Jan 12, 2018; 7:00 pm		High Point	W 65–54	9–8 (3–2)	Gore Arena (1,808); Buies Creek, NC
Jan 15, 2018; 7:00 pm		at Longwood	L 62–76	9–9 (3–3)	Willett Hall (1,407); Farmville, VA
Jan 18, 2018; 7:00 pm		Charleston Southern	W 62–47	10–9 (4–3)	Gore Arena (1,721); Buies Creek, NC
Jan 21, 2018; 2:00 pm		Radford	W 59–56	11–9 (5–3)	Gore Arena (1,392); Buies Creek, NC
Jan 23, 2018; 7:00 pm		at Liberty	W 94–85	12–9 (6–3)	Vines Center (2,452); Lynchburg, VA
Jan 27, 2018; 2:00 pm		at Winthrop	L 64–75	12–10 (6–4)	Winthrop Coliseum (1,271); Rock Hill, SC
Feb 1, 2018; 7:00 pm		UNC Asheville	L 57–64	12–11 (6–5)	Gore Arena (1,921); Buies Creek, NC
Feb 3, 2018; 7:00 pm, ESPN3		at High Point	L 56–67	12–12 (6–6)	Millis Athletic Center (1,750); High Point, NC
Feb 7, 2018; 7:00 pm		at Gardner–Webb	W 78–70	13–12 (7–6)	Paul Porter Arena (1,125); Boiling Springs, NC
Feb 10, 2018; 4:30 pm, ESPN3		Longwood	W 88–54	14–12 (8–6)	Gore Arena (2,033); Buies Creek, NC
Feb 15, 2018; 9:00 pm, ESPNU		at Radford	L 53–72	14–13 (8–7)	Dedmon Center (2,012); Radford, VA
Feb 18, 2018; 2:00 pm, Stadium		Liberty	W 79–69	15–13 (9–7)	Gore Arena (2,126); Buies Creek, NC
Feb 22, 2018; 7:30 pm		at Charleston Southern	L 68–72	15–14 (9–8)	CSU Field House (696); North Charleston, SC
Feb 24, 2018; 4:30 pm		Presbyterian	W 72–56	16–14 (10–8)	Gore Arena (2,086); Buies Creek, NC
Big South tournament
Mar 1, 2018; 9:30 pm, ESPN3	(4)	vs. (5) Liberty; Quarterfinals	L 59–73	16–15	Kimmel Arena (2,276); Asheville, NC
CBI
Mar 14, 2018*; 7:00 pm		Miami (OH); First round	W 97–87	17–15	Gore Arena (1,411); Buies Creek, NC
Mar 19, 2018*; 7:00 pm		New Orleans; Quarterfinals	W 71–69	18–15	Gore Arena (1,316); Buies Creek, NC
Mar 22, 2018*; 10:00 pm, ESPN3		at San Francisco; Semifinals	L 62–65	18–16	War Memorial Gymnasium (1,163); San Francisco, CA
*Non-conference game. ^{#}Rankings from AP Poll. (#) Tournament seedings in parentheses. All times are in Eastern Time Source.
