= 2017–18 Radford Highlanders men's basketball team =

American college basketball season

2017–18 Radford Highlanders men's basketball
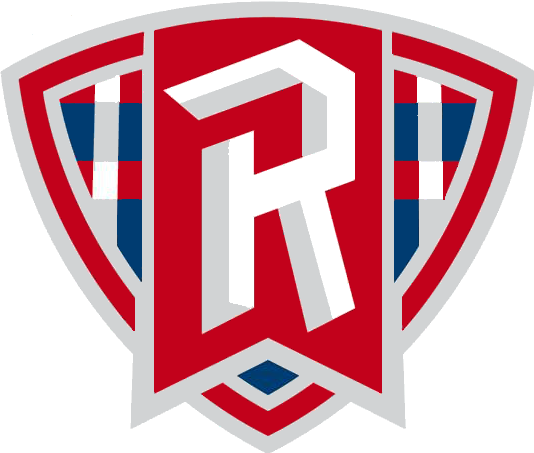

Big South tournament champions Las Vegas Classic Visitors Bracket champions

NCAA tournament, First Round
- Conference: Big South Conference
- Record: 23–13 (12–6 Big South)
- Head coach: Mike Jones (7th season)
- Assistant coaches: Ron Jirsa; David Boyden; Donny Lind
- Home arena: Dedmon Center

2017–18 Big South men's basketball standings
	Conf.				Overall
Team	W		L	PCT	W		L	PCT
UNC Asheville	13	–	5	.722	21	–	13	.618
Radford †	12	–	6	.667	23	–	13	.639
Winthrop	12	–	6	.667	19	–	12	.613
Campbell	10	–	8	.556	18	–	16	.529
Liberty	9	–	9	.500	22	–	15	.595
Charleston Southern	9	–	9	.500	15	–	16	.484
High Point	9	–	9	.500	14	–	16	.467
Gardner–Webb	9	–	9	.500	14	–	18	.438
Presbyterian	4	–	14	.222	11	–	21	.344
Longwood	3	–	15	.167	7	–	26	.212
† 2018 Big South tournament winner

The 2017–18 Radford Highlanders men's basketball team represented Radford University during the 2017–18 NCAA Division I men's basketball season. The Highlanders, led by seventh-year head coach Mike Jones, played their home games at the Dedmon Center in Radford, Virginia as members of the Big South Conference. They finished the season 23–13, 12–6 in Big South play to finish in a tie for second place. They defeated Longwood, Winthrop, and Liberty to become champions of the Big South tournament. The received the Big South's automatic bid to the NCAA tournament where they defeated LIU Brooklyn in the First Four before losing in the first round to the eventual national champion Villanova.

== Previous season ==
The Highlanders finished the season 14–18, 8–10 in Big South play to finish in a sixth place. They received the No. 6 seed in the Big South tournament where they defeated Liberty in the quarterfinals to advance to the semifinals where they lost to Campbell.

== Roster ==
2017–18 Radford Highlanders men's basketball team
Players
Coaches

Pos.	#	Name	Height	Weight	Year	Hometown
G	1	Carlik Jones	6 ft 0 in (1.83 m)	170 lb (77 kg)	RS Fr	Cincinnati, Ohio
F	2	Tristan Owens	6 ft 5 in (1.96 m)	195 lb (88 kg)	Jr	Orlando, Florida
G	3	Christian Bradford	6 ft 1 in (1.85 m)	165 lb (75 kg)	Sr	Columbus, Georgia
G	4	Devin Cooper	6 ft 1 in (1.85 m)	175 lb (79 kg)	RS So	Charlotte, North Carolina
G	5	Donald Hicks	6 ft 3 in (1.91 m)	170 lb (77 kg)	So	Chesapeake, Virginia
G	10	Caleb Tanner	6 ft 1 in (1.85 m)	170 lb (77 kg)	Jr	Floyd, Virginia
G	11	Travis Fields Jr.	5 ft 9 in (1.75 m)	150 lb (68 kg)	So	Portsmouth, Virginia
G	12	John Caldwell	6 ft 5 in (1.96 m)	200 lb (91 kg)	Jr	Spartanburg, South Carolina
F	13	Leroy Butts IV	6 ft 7 in (2.01 m)	210 lb (95 kg)	Fr	Washington, D.C.
G	14	Justin Cousin	6 ft 0 in (1.83 m)	195 lb (88 kg)	RS Sr	Burlington, North Carolina
F	15	Devonnte Holland	6 ft 7 in (2.01 m)	240 lb (109 kg)	So	Martinsville, Virginia
G	23	Anias Saunders	6 ft 2 in (1.88 m)	195 lb (88 kg)	RS Fr	Culpeper, Virginia
F	24	Ed Polite, Jr.	6 ft 5 in (1.96 m)	200 lb (91 kg)	Jr	Lanham, Maryland
C	32	Randy Phillips	6 ft 8 in (2.03 m)	240 lb (109 kg)	Sr	Jackson, Mississippi
C	45	Darius Bolstad	6 ft 8 in (2.03 m)	240 lb (109 kg)	Jr	Virginia Beach, Virginia

Head coach

- Mike Jones (Howard)

Assistant coach(es)

- Ron Jirsa (Gettysburg)
- David Boyden (Western Kentucky)
- Donny Lind (Loyola (MD))

Legend

- (C) Team captain
- (S) Suspended
- (I) Ineligible
- (W) Walk-on
- Injured
- Current redshirt

Roster
Last update: October 25, 2017

== Schedule and results ==
Date time, TV	Rank^{#}	Opponent^{#}	Result	Record	Site (attendance) city, state
Exhibition
Nov 3, 2017*; 7:00 pm		West Virginia State	W 106–81		Dedmon Center (422); Radford, VA
Non-conference Regular season
Nov 10, 2017*; 7:00 pm		Georgia Southwestern	W 72–63	1–0	Dedmon Center (1,632); Radford, VA
Nov 12, 2017*; 2:30 pm, BTN+		at Ohio State	L 72–82	1–1	Value City Arena (10,425); Columbus, OH
Nov 15, 2017*; 7:00 pm, ESPN3		at East Carolina	W 73–66	2–1	Williams Arena (3,384); Greenville, NC
Nov 22, 2017*; 7:00 pm		at Elon	L 74–77	2–2	Alumni Gym (1,490); Elon, NC
Nov 25, 2017*; 4:00 pm		James Madison	W 69–68	3–2	Dedmon Center (1,314); Radford, VA
Nov 28, 2017*; 9:00 pm, SECN		at Vanderbilt	L 62–74	3–3	Memorial Gymnasium (8,027); Nashville, TN
Dec 2, 2017*; 1:00 pm		at VMI	W 63–50	4–3	Cameron Hall (2,681); Lexington, VA
Dec 6, 2017*; 6:00 pm, ACCN Extra		at Virginia Tech; Rivalry	L 68–95	4–4	Cassell Coliseum (7,265); Blacksburg, VA
Dec 9, 2017*; 4:00 pm		Erskine	W 76–49	5–4	Dedmon Center (1,292); Radford, VA
Dec 17, 2017*; 6:00 pm, ATTSNRM		at Nevada; Las Vegas Classic	L 62–77	5–5	Lawlor Events Center (7,272); Reno, NV
Dec 19, 2017*; 10:00 pm		at San Francisco; Las Vegas Classic	L 41–52	5–6	War Memorial Gymnasium (1,004); San Francisco, CA
Dec 22, 2017*; 3:00 pm		vs. North Carolina A&T; Las Vegas Classic	W 66–60	6–6	Orleans Arena; Paradise, NV
Dec 23, 2017*; 5:30 pm		vs. UC Davis; Las Vegas Classic	W 72–62	7–6	Orleans Arena; Paradise, NV
Big South Conference regular season
Dec 30, 2017; 4:00 pm		at Presbyterian	W 78–62	8–6 (1–0)	Templeton Center (301); Clinton, SC
Jan 3, 2018; 7:00 pm		Winthrop	W 85–79	9–6 (2–0)	Dedmon Center (634); Radford, VA
Jan 6, 2018; 4:00 pm		UNC Asheville	W 90–70	10–6 (3–0)	Dedmon Center (981); Radford, VA
Jan 9, 2018; 7:30 pm		at Charleston Southern	W 64–61	11–6 (4–0)	CSU Field House (711); North Charleston, SC
Jan 12, 2018; 7:00 pm, ESPN3		at Gardner–Webb	L 54–59	11–7 (4–1)	Paul Porter Arena (1,244); Boiling Springs, NC
Jan 15, 2018; 7:00 pm, ESPN3		Liberty	W 59–57 ^{OT}	12–7 (5–1)	Dedmon Center (1,493); Radford, VA
Jan 18, 2018; 7:00 pm		Longwood	W 70–63	13–7 (6–1)	Dedmon Center (1,551); Radford, VA
Jan 21, 2018; 2:00 pm		at Campbell	L 56–59	13–8 (6–2)	Gore Arena (1,392); Buies Creek, NC
Jan 24, 2018; 7:00 pm		at High Point	W 78–76 ^{OT}	14–8 (7–2)	Millis Athletic Center (894); High Point, NC
Jan 27, 2018; 7:00 pm		Charleston Southern	L 81–84 ^{OT}	14–9 (7–3)	Dedmon Center (1,707); Radford, VA
Feb 1, 2018; 7:00 pm		Gardner–Webb	W 70–66	15–9 (8–3)	Dedmon Center (2,041); Radford, VA
Feb 3, 2018; 2:00 pm		at Winthrop	L 57–75	15–10 (8–4)	Winthrop Coliseum (1,980); Rock Hill, SC
Feb 7, 2018; 7:00 pm		High Point	L 60–61	15–11 (8–5)	Dedmon Center (1,033); Radford, VA
Feb 10, 2018; 2:00 pm		at UNC Asheville	L 64–66	15–12 (8–6)	Kimmel Arena (2,012); Asheville, NC
Feb 15, 2018; 9:00 pm, ESPNU		Campbell	W 72–53	16–12 (9–6)	Dedmon Center (2,012); Radford, VA
Feb 18, 2018; 3:00 pm		Presbyterian	W 74–68 ^{OT}	17–12 (10–6)	Dedmon Center (1,184); Radford, VA
Feb 22, 2018; 7:00 pm		at Liberty	W 63–50	18–12 (11–6)	Vines Center (2,669); Lynchburg, VA
Feb 24, 2018; 2:00 pm		at Longwood	W 70–47	19–12 (12–6)	Willett Hall (1,384); Farmville, VA
Big South tournament
Mar 1, 2018; 1:00 pm, ESPN3	(2)	vs. (10) Longwood; Quarterfinals	W 59–53	20–12	Kimmel Arena (1,159); Asheville, NC
Mar 2, 2018; 6:00 pm, ESPN3	(2)	vs. (3) Winthrop; Semifinals	W 61–52	21–12	Kimmel Arena (2,318); Asheville, NC
Mar 4, 2018; 1:00 pm, ESPN	(2)	(5) Liberty; Championship	W 55–52	22–12	Dedmon Center (3,859); Radford, VA
NCAA tournament
Mar 13, 2018; 6:40 pm, truTV	(16 E)	vs. (16 E) LIU Brooklyn; First Four	W 71–61	23–12	UD Arena (12,336); Dayton, OH
Mar 15, 2018; 6:50 pm, TNT	(16 E)	vs. (1 E) No. 2 Villanova; First Round	L 61–87	23–13	PPG Paints Arena (18,715); Pittsburgh, PA
*Non-conference game. ^{#}Rankings from AP Poll. (#) Tournament seedings in parentheses. E=East Source. All times are in Eastern Time.
