= 2017–18 Gardner–Webb Runnin' Bulldogs men's basketball team =

American college basketball season

2017–18 Gardner–Webb Runnin' Bulldogs men's basketball
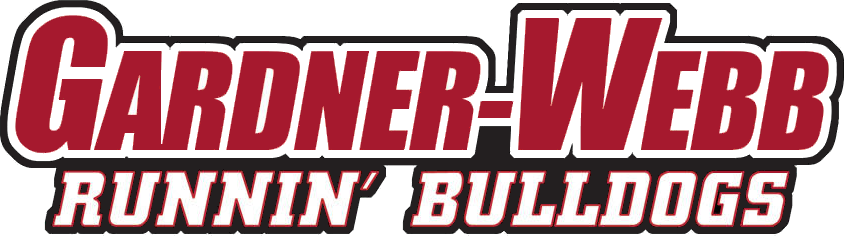
- Conference: Big South Conference
- Record: 14–18 (9–9 Big South)
- Head coach: Tim Craft (5th season)
- Assistant coaches: Jeremy Luther; Paul Hemrick; DeAntoine Beasley
- Home arena: Paul Porter Arena

2017–18 Big South men's basketball standings
	Conf.				Overall
Team	W		L	PCT	W		L	PCT
UNC Asheville	13	–	5	.722	21	–	13	.618
Radford †	12	–	6	.667	23	–	13	.639
Winthrop	12	–	6	.667	19	–	12	.613
Campbell	10	–	8	.556	18	–	16	.529
Liberty	9	–	9	.500	22	–	15	.595
Charleston Southern	9	–	9	.500	15	–	16	.484
High Point	9	–	9	.500	14	–	16	.467
Gardner–Webb	9	–	9	.500	14	–	18	.438
Presbyterian	4	–	14	.222	11	–	21	.344
Longwood	3	–	15	.167	7	–	26	.212
† 2018 Big South tournament winner

The 2017–18 Gardner–Webb Runnin' Bulldogs men's basketball team represented Gardner–Webb University during the 2017–18 NCAA Division I men's basketball season. The Runnin' Bulldogs, led by fifth-year head coach Tim Craft, played their home games at the Paul Porter Arena in Boiling Springs, North Carolina as members of the Big South Conference. They finished the season 14–18, 9–9 in Big South play to finish in a four-way tie for fifth place. As the No. 6 seed in the Big South tournament, they lost to Winthrop in the quarterfinals.

== Previous season ==
The Runnin' Bulldogs finished the 2016–17 season 18–13, 11–7 in Big South play to finish in fourth place. In the Big South tournament, they defeated High Point in the quarterfinals before losing in the semifinals to Winthrop.

== Roster ==
2017–18 Gardner–Webb Runnin' Bulldogs men's basketball team
Players
Coaches

Pos.	#	Name	Height	Weight	Year	Hometown
G	0	Jamaal Robateau	6 ft 5 in (1.96 m)	180 lb (82 kg)	RS Sr	Sunshine Coast, Queensland, Australia
G	1	Jaheam Cornwall	6 ft 0 in (1.83 m)	175 lb (79 kg)	RS Fr	Brooklyn, New York
G/F	2	Eric Jamison	6 ft 5 in (1.96 m)	185 lb (84 kg)	RS So	East Point, Georgia
G	3	Justin Jenkins	6 ft 2 in (1.88 m)	200 lb (91 kg)	RS So	Knoxville, Tennessee
G	4	Christian Turner	5 ft 10 in (1.78 m)	180 lb (82 kg)	So	Atlanta, Georgia
G	5	Liam O'Reilly	6 ft 2 in (1.88 m)	180 lb (82 kg)	Sr	Austin, Texas
G	10	Nate Johnson	6 ft 4 in (1.93 m)	180 lb (82 kg)	RS Fr	Miami, Florida
G	11	David Efianayi	6 ft 2 in (1.88 m)	185 lb (84 kg)	RS Jr	Orlando, Florida
C	13	Acton Shirley	7 ft 0 in (2.13 m)	230 lb (104 kg)	RS Fr	Zebulon, Georgia
C	14	Brandon Miller	6 ft 6 in (1.98 m)	250 lb (113 kg)	RS Jr	Orlando, Florida
F	21	Peyton Truesdale	6 ft 2 in (1.88 m)	180 lb (82 kg)	Fr	Asheville, North Carolina
G	23	Nick Morgan	6 ft 2 in (1.88 m)	185 lb (84 kg)	Fr	Bluefield, Virginia
F	24	Patrick Zeck	6 ft 7 in (2.01 m)	225 lb (102 kg)	So	Atlanta, Georgia
F	25	DJ Laster	6 ft 6 in (1.98 m)	230 lb (104 kg)	Jr	Pensacola, Florida
C	31	L'Hassane Niangane	6 ft 10 in (2.08 m)	245 lb (111 kg)	Sr	Chalon-sur-Saône, France
G	35	Kaleb Hewitt	5 ft 10 in (1.78 m)	165 lb (75 kg)	Fr	Hickory, North Carolina

Head coach

- Tim Craft (Florida)

Assistant coach(es)

- Jeremy Luther (North Greenville)
- Paul Hemrick (Georgia)
- DeAntoine Beasley (Tennessee Tech)

Legend

- (C) Team captain
- (S) Suspended
- (I) Ineligible
- (W) Walk-on
- Injured
- Current redshirt

Roster
Last update: October 24, 2017

== Schedule and results ==
Date time, TV	Rank^{#}	Opponent^{#}	Result	Record	Site (attendance) city, state
Non-conference regular season
Nov 10, 2017*; 8:00 pm, ACC Network Extra		at No. 13 Miami (FL)	L 45–77	0–1	Watsco Center (7,073); Coral Gables, FL
Nov 13, 2017*; 7:00 pm, ESPNU		at No. 8 Florida	L 74–116	0–2	O'Connell Center (8,604); Gainesville, FL
Nov 15, 2017*; 7:00 pm, ESPN3		at UCF	L 65–68	0–3	CFE Arena (4,016); Orlando, FL
Nov 18, 2017*; 7:00 pm		Warren Wilson	W 119–81	1–3	Paul Porter Arena (697); Boiling Springs, NC
Nov 21, 2017*; 7:00 pm		Brevard	W 93–70	2–3	Paul Porter Arena (425); Boiling Springs, NC
Nov 24, 2017*; 7:00 pm, ESPN3		at Wright State; Wright State Tournament	L 47–67	2–4	Nutter Center (3,456); Fairborn, OH
Nov 25, 2017*; 2:30 pm, ESPN3		vs. Fairfield; Wright State Tournament	L 64–75	2–5	Nutter Center (3,030); Fairborn, OH
Nov 26, 2017*; 1:30 pm, ESPN3		vs. Jacksonville; Wright State Tournament	L 99–106 ^{3OT}	2–6	Nutter Center (3,045); Fairborn, OH
Dec 2, 2017*; 7:00 pm		USC Upstate	W 87–66	3–6	Paul Porter Arena (725); Boiling Springs, NC
Dec 6, 2017*; 8:00 pm, SECN+		at Auburn	L 55–80	3–7	Auburn Arena (6,232); Auburn, AL
Dec 9, 2017*; 12:30 pm, BTN+		at Maryland	L 60–82	3–8	Xfinity Center (12,588); College Park, MD
Dec 17, 2017*; 2:00 pm		at Hampton	W 80–79	4–8	Hampton Convocation Center (3,112); Hampton, VA
Dec 20, 2017*; 7:00 pm		Toccoa Falls	W 102–41	5–8	Paul Porter Arena (1,408); Boiling Springs, NC
Big South regular season
Dec 30, 2017; 7:00 pm		Liberty	W 58–55	6–8 (1–0)	Paul Porter Arena (1,250); Boiling Springs, NC
Jan 3, 2018; 7:00 pm		at Campbell	W 82–80 ^{OT}	7–8 (2–0)	Gore Arena (922); Buies Creek, NC
Jan 6, 2018; 2:00 pm		at Longwood	L 73–79	7–9 (2–1)	Willett Hall (1,373); Farmville, VA
Jan 9, 2018; 7:00 pm		High Point	W 62–45	8–9 (3–1)	Paul Porter Arena (1,105); Boiling Springs, NC
Jan 12, 2018; 7:00 pm, ESPN3		Radford	W 59–54	9–9 (4–1)	Paul Porter Arena (1,244); Boiling Springs, NC
Jan 15, 2018; 7:00 pm		at Winthrop	L 67–90	9–10 (4–2)	Winthrop Coliseum (996); Rock Hill, SC
Jan 18, 2018; 7:00 pm		Presbyterian	W 61–53	10–10 (5–2)	Paul Porter Arena (1,269); Boiling Springs, NC
Jan 21, 2018; 5:30 pm		at Charleston Southern	L 68–83	10–11 (5–3)	CSU Field House (525); North Charleston, SC
Jan 24, 2018; 7:00 pm		at UNC Asheville	L 60–65	10–12 (5–4)	Kimmel Arena (1,712); Asheville, NC
Jan 27, 2018; 7:00 pm		Longwood	W 60–57	11–12 (6–4)	Paul Porter Arena (908); Boiling Springs, NC
Feb 1, 2018; 7:00 pm		at Radford	L 66–70	11–13 (6–5)	Dedmon Center (2,041); Radford, VA
Feb 3, 2018; 7:00 pm		Charleston Southern	W 63–61	12–13 (7–5)	Paul Porter Arena (1,449); Boiling Springs, NC
Feb 7, 2018; 7:00 pm		Campbell	L 70–78	12–14 (7–6)	Paul Porter Arena (1,125); Boiling Springs, NC
Feb 10, 2018; 7:00 pm		at Liberty	L 65–77	12–15 (7–7)	Vines Center (3,197); Lynchburg, VA
Feb 15, 2018; 7:00 pm		Winthrop	L 71–90	12–16 (7–8)	Paul Porter Arena (1,252); Boiling Springs, NC
Feb 18, 2018; 2:00 pm		at High Point	L 65–66	12–17 (7–9)	Millis Athletic Center (1,127); High Point, NC
Feb 22, 2018; 7:00 pm		at Presbyterian	W 78–63	13–17 (8–9)	Templeton Center (353); Clinton, SC
Feb 24, 2018; 4:30 pm, ESPN3		UNC Asheville	W 72–61	14–17 (9–9)	Paul Porter Arena (1,581); Boiling Springs, NC
Big South tournament
Mar 1, 2018; 3:30 pm, ESPN3	(6)	vs. (3) Winthrop; Quarterfinals	L 68–72	14–18	Kimmel Arena (1,159); Asheville, NC
*Non-conference game. ^{#}Rankings from AP Poll. (#) Tournament seedings in parentheses. All times are in Eastern Time Source.
