= 2017–18 UNC Asheville Bulldogs men's basketball team =

American college basketball season

2017–18 UNC Asheville Bulldogs men's basketball
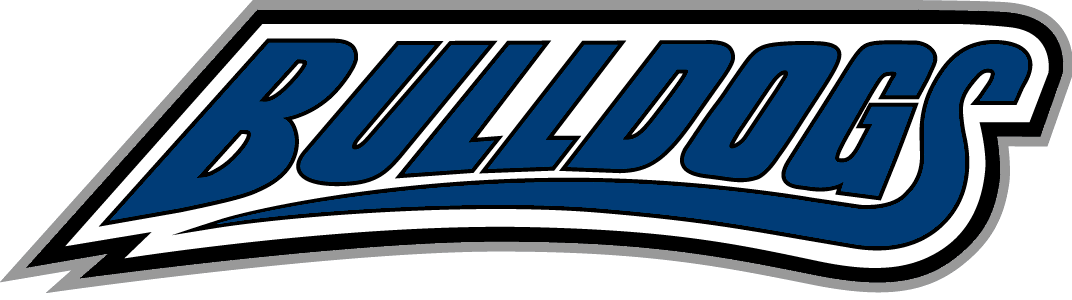

Big South regular season champions

NIT, First round
- Conference: Big South Conference
- Record: 21–13 (13–5 Big South)
- Head coach: Nick McDevitt (5th season)
- Assistant coaches: Sean Dixon; Logan Johnson; Wes Long
- Home arena: Kimmel Arena

2017–18 Big South men's basketball standings
	Conf.				Overall
Team	W		L	PCT	W		L	PCT
UNC Asheville	13	–	5	.722	21	–	13	.618
Radford †	12	–	6	.667	23	–	13	.639
Winthrop	12	–	6	.667	19	–	12	.613
Campbell	10	–	8	.556	18	–	16	.529
Liberty	9	–	9	.500	22	–	15	.595
Charleston Southern	9	–	9	.500	15	–	16	.484
High Point	9	–	9	.500	14	–	16	.467
Gardner–Webb	9	–	9	.500	14	–	18	.438
Presbyterian	4	–	14	.222	11	–	21	.344
Longwood	3	–	15	.167	7	–	26	.212
† 2018 Big South tournament winner

The 2017–18 UNC Asheville Bulldogs men's basketball team represented the University of North Carolina at Asheville during the 2017–18 NCAA Division I men's basketball season. The Bulldogs, led by fifth-year head coach Nick McDevitt, played their home games at Kimmel Arena as members of the Big South Conference. They finished the season 21–13, 13–5 in Big South play to win the Big South regular season championship. They defeated Charleston Southern in the quarterfinals of the Big South tournament before being upset in the semifinals by Liberty. As a regular season conference champion who failed to win their conference tournament, they received an automatic bid to the National Invitation Tournament where they lost in the first round to USC.

On March 24, 2018, head coach Nick McDevitt accepted the head coaching job at Middle Tennessee. He finished at UNC Asheville with a five-year record of 98–65.

== Previous season ==
The Bulldogs finished the season 23–10, 15–3 in Big South play to finish in a tie for the Big South regular season championship. They were upset in the quarterfinals of the Big South tournament by Campbell. They were invited to the CollegeInsider.com Tournament where they lost in the first round to UT Martin.

== Roster ==
2017–18 UNC Asheville Bulldogs men's basketball team
Players
Coaches

Pos.	#	Name	Height	Weight	Year	Hometown
F	0	Donovan Gilmore	6 ft 7 in (2.01 m)	200 lb (91 kg)	Jr	Greensboro, North Carolina
F	1	Jonathan Baehre	6 ft 10 in (2.08 m)	205 lb (93 kg)	So	Hessen, Germany
F	2	Alec Wnuk	6 ft 7 in (2.01 m)	205 lb (93 kg)	Sr	Cary, North Carolina
F	3	Asante Monadjemi	6 ft 6 in (1.98 m)	190 lb (86 kg)	Jr	Durham, North Carolina
G	4	LJ Thorpe	6 ft 4 in (1.93 m)	225 lb (102 kg)	Fr	West Palm Beach, Florida
G	5	Justin Brown	6 ft 2 in (1.88 m)	200 lb (91 kg)	So	Miami, Florida
G	10	Kevin Vannatta	6 ft 2 in (1.88 m)	200 lb (91 kg)	Sr	Upper Arlington, Ohio
G	11	Jalen Seegars	6 ft 4 in (1.93 m)	220 lb (100 kg)	Fr	Greensboro, North Carolina
G	12	Raekwon Miller	6 ft 3 in (1.91 m)	175 lb (79 kg)	Sr	Marion, North Carolina
G	13	Tajion Jones	6 ft 5 in (1.96 m)	180 lb (82 kg)	Fr	Oak Ridge, Tennessee
G	14	Ahmad Thomas	6 ft 3 in (1.91 m)	215 lb (98 kg)	Sr	Danville, Virginia
F	15	Grant Townsend	6 ft 7 in (2.01 m)	215 lb (98 kg)	So	Riverview, Florida
G	31	MaCio Teague	6 ft 3 in (1.91 m)	190 lb (86 kg)	So	Cincinnati, Ohio
G	33	Drew Rackley	6 ft 1 in (1.85 m)	190 lb (86 kg)	So	New Concord, Ohio
G	34	Jeremy Peck	6 ft 8 in (2.03 m)	230 lb (104 kg)	So	Houston, TX

Head coach

- Nick McDevitt (UNC Asheville)

Assistant coach(es)

- Sean Dixon (Presbyterian)
- Logan Johnson (Coastal Carolina)
- Wes Long (Clemson)

Legend

- (C) Team captain
- (S) Suspended
- (I) Ineligible
- (W) Walk-on
- Injured
- Current redshirt

Roster
Last update: August 30, 2017

== Schedule and results ==
Date time, TV	Rank^{#}	Opponent^{#}	Result	Record	Site (attendance) city, state
Non-conference regular season
Nov 10, 2017*; 7:30 pm		at Rhode Island; NIT Season Tip-Off	L 60–84	0–1	Ryan Center (6,367); Kingston, RI
Nov 13, 2017*; 7:00 pm		Lees–McRae	W 92–60	1–1	Kimmel Arena (1,024); Asheville, NC
Nov 17, 2017*; 8:00 pm, SECN+		at Vanderbilt; NIT Season Tip-Off	L 76–79	1–2	Memorial Gymnasium (8,048); Nashville, TN
Nov 19, 2017*; 3:00 pm		at Austin Peay; NIT Season Tip-Off	W 82–79 ^{OT}	2–2	Dunn Center (2,017); Clarksville, TN
Nov 22, 2017*; 7:00 pm		Monmouth; NIT Season Tip-Off	W 62–51	3–2	Kimmel Arena (1,008); Asheville, NC
Nov 26, 2017*; 4:30 pm, WMYA		Wofford	W 85–65	4–2	Kimmel Arena (1,323); Asheville, NC
Nov 29, 2017*; 7:00 pm, WMYA		USC Upstate	W 82–70	5–2	Kimmel Arena (1,436); Asheville, NC
Dec 3, 2017*; 3:00 pm, ACCN Extra		at Clemson	L 52–83	5–3	Littlejohn Coliseum (5,932); Clemson, SC
Dec 5, 2017*; 7:30 pm, ESPN3		at Furman	L 72–83	5–4	Timmons Arena (1,389); Greenville, SC
Dec 10, 2017*; 3:30 pm		Milligan	W 97–60	6–4	Kimmel Arena (1,081); Asheville, NC
Dec 17, 2017*; 4:30 pm		vs. Western Carolina; Mountain Invitational	L 72–76	6–5	U.S. Cellular Center (1,423); Asheville, NC
Dec 19, 2017*; 7:00 pm, ESPN3		at UNC Greensboro	W 67–60	7–5	Greensboro Coliseum (2,172); Greensboro, NC
Dec 22, 2017*; 10:00 pm, TheW.tv		at Saint Mary's	L 69–95	7–6	McKeon Pavilion (3,221); Moraga, CA
Big South Conference regular season
Dec 30, 2017; 2:00 pm, WMYA		Campbell	W 85–79	8–6 (1–0)	Kimmel Arena (1,598); Asheville, NC
Jan 3, 2018; 7:00 pm		at High Point	L 74–84	8–7 (1–1)	Millis Athletic Center (1,121); High Point, NC
Jan 6, 2018; 4:00 pm		at Radford	L 70–90	8–8 (1–2)	Dedmon Center (981); Radford, VA
Jan 9, 2018; 7:00 pm		Longwood	W 90–80	9–8 (2–2)	Kimmel Arena (1,312); Asheville, NC
Jan 12, 2018; 7:00 pm		at Presbyterian	W 76–56	10–8 (3–2)	Templeton Center (462); Clinton, SC
Jan 15, 2018; 7:00 pm, ESPN3		Charleston Southern	W 83–73	11–8 (4–2)	Kimmel Arena (1,723); Asheville, NC
Jan 18, 2018; 9:00 pm, ESPNU		at Winthrop	L 58–85	11–9 (4–3)	Winthrop Coliseum (3,347); Rock Hill, SC
Jan 21, 2018; 2:00 pm, Stadium		at Liberty	W 84–68	12–9 (5–3)	Vines Center (2,426); Lynchburg, VA
Jan 24, 2018; 7:00 pm, WMYA		Gardner–Webb	W 65–60	13–9 (6–3)	Kimmel Arena (1,712); Asheville, NC
Jan 27, 2018; 4:30 pm, ESPN3		High Point	W 84–77	14–9 (7–3)	Kimmel Arena (2,104); Asheville, NC
Feb 1, 2018; 7:00 pm		at Campbell	W 64–57	15–9 (8–3)	Gore Arena (1,921); Buies Creek, NC
Feb 3, 2018; 4:30 pm		Presbyterian	W 75–61	16–9 (9–3)	Kimmel Arena (2,608); Asheville, NC
Feb 7, 2018; 7:00 pm		at Longwood	W 78–73	17–9 (10–3)	Willett Hall (1,473); Farmville, VA
Feb 10, 2018; 2:00 pm		Radford	W 66–64	18–9 (11–3)	Kimmel Arena (2,012); Asheville, NC
Feb 15, 2018; 7:00 pm		Liberty	L 69–82 ^{OT}	18–10 (11–4)	Kimmel Arena (1,719); Asheville, NC
Feb 18, 2018; 5:30 pm		at Charleston Southern	W 85–80 ^{OT}	19–10 (12–4)	CSU Field House (722); North Charleston, SC
Feb 22, 2018; 7:00 pm		Winthrop	W 89–75	20–10 (13–4)	Kimmel Arena (2,978); Asheville, NC
Feb 24, 2018; 4:30 pm, ESPN3		at Gardner–Webb	L 61–72	20–11 (13–5)	Paul Porter Arena (1,581); Boiling Springs, NC
Big South tournament
Mar 1, 2018; 7:00 pm, ESPN3	(1)	(8) Charleston Southern; Quarterfinals	W 71–66	21–11	Kimmel Arena (2,276); Asheville, NC
Mar 2, 2018; 8:30 pm, ESPN3	(1)	(5) Liberty; Semifinals	L 64–69	21–12	Kimmel Arena (2,318); Asheville, NC
NIT
Mar 13, 2018*; 11:00 pm, ESPN2	(8)	at (1) USC; First round – USC Bracket	L 98–103 ^{2OT}	21–13	Galen Center (1,614); Los Angeles, CA
*Non-conference game. ^{#}Rankings from AP Poll. (#) Tournament seedings in parentheses. All times are in Eastern Time Source.
