= Mike Jones (basketball, born 1965) =

American basketball player and coach

Current position
- Team: Rice
- Conference: American

Biographical details
- Born: April 30, 1965 (age 61)
- Education: Howard University (1987)

Playing career
- 1983–1987: Howard

Coaching career (HC unless noted)
- 1990–1994: Sidwell Friends School
- 1994–1997: Howard (assistant)
- 1997–2000: Furman (assistant)
- 2000–2002: Richmond (assistant)
- 2002–2003: West Virginia (assistant)
- 2003–2009: Georgia (assistant)
- 2009–2011: VCU (assistant)
- 2011–2021: Radford
- 2021–2026: UNC Greensboro
- 2026–present: Rice (assistant)

Head coaching record
- Overall: 267–219 (.549)
- Tournaments: 1–1 (NCAA); 2–3 (CBI)

Accomplishments and honors

Championships
- Big South tournament (2018); 2 Big South regular season (2019, 2020)

Awards
- 2x Big South Coach of the Year (2018, 2020); SoCon co-Coach of the Year – Media (2023)

Michael Ray Jones (born April 30, 1965) is an American college basketball coach and former player who is currently an assistant coach for the Rice Owls men's basketball team. He was previously the head coach at UNC Greensboro and Radford.

== Coaching career ==
=== Radford (2011-2021) ===
Mike Jones spent 10 years as head men's basketball coach at Radford. During his time there, he was named Big South Conference Coach of the Year in 2018 and 2020. While at Radford, Jones coached Javonte Green, the first player in Radford program history to play in the NBA.

=== UNC Greensboro (2021-2026) ===
In April 2021, Jones was hired to be the head men's basketball coach at UNC Greensboro. On March 9, 2026 it was announced that UNC Greensboro would not renew Jones' contract.

=== Rice (2026–present) ===
In August 2026, Jones was hired as an assistant coach at Rice, marking his first time in an assistant position since 2011.

== Personal life ==
Jones is married to Dr. Sharon Blackwell Jones, with whom he has two sons who both played college basketball.

Jones' father, Jimmy Jones, played professionally in the ABA from 1967 to 1974 and in the NBA from to 1977.

== Head coaching record ==
Record table
Season	Team	Overall	Conference	Standing	Postseason
Radford Highlanders (Big South Conference) (2011–2021)
2011–12	Radford	6–26	2–16	11th	
2012–13	Radford	13–19	7–9	3rd (North)	
2013–14	Radford	22–13	10–6	3rd (North)	CBI Quarterfinals
2014–15	Radford	22–12	12–6	T–3rd	CBI Quarterfinals
2015–16	Radford	16–15	9–9	7th	
2016–17	Radford	14–18	8–10	6th	
2017–18	Radford	23–13	12–6	T–2nd	NCAA Division I Round of 64
2018–19	Radford	22–11	12–4	T–1st	
2019–20	Radford	21–11	15–3	T–1st	Postseason cancelled due to COVID-19
2020–21	Radford	15–12	12–6	2nd	
Radford:		174–150 (.537)	99–75 (.569)		
UNC Greensboro Spartans (Southern Conference) (2021–2026)
2021–22	UNC Greensboro	17–15	9–9	T–5th	CBI first round
2022–23	UNC Greensboro	20–12	14–4	3rd	
2023–24	UNC Greensboro	21–11	12–6	T–2nd	
2024–25	UNC Greensboro	20–12	13–5	2nd	
2025–26	UNC Greensboro	15–19	9–9	7th	
UNC Greensboro:		92–69 (.571)	57–33 (.633)		
Total:		267–219 (.549)			
National champion Postseason invitational champion Conference regular season champion Conference regular season and conference tournament champion Division regular season champion Division regular season and conference tournament champion Conference tournament champion
