= 2017–18 Virginia Tech Hokies men's basketball team =

American college basketball season

2017–18 Virginia Tech Hokies men's basketball
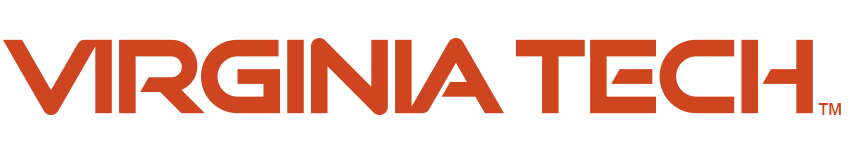

NCAA tournament, First Round
- Conference: Atlantic Coast Conference
- Record: 21–12 (10–8 ACC)
- Head coach: Buzz Williams (4th season)
- Assistant coaches: Steve Roccaforte; Jamie McNeilly; Christian Webster
- Home arena: Cassell Coliseum

2017–18 ACC men's basketball standings
| | Conf. | | | | Overall |
| Team | W | | L | PCT | W | | L | PCT |
|---|---|---|---|---|---|---|---|---|
| No. 1 Virginia † | 17 | – | 1 | .944 | 31 | – | 3 | .912 |
| No. 9 Duke | 13 | – | 5 | .722 | 29 | – | 8 | .784 |
| No. 22 Miami (FL) | 11 | – | 7 | .611 | 22 | – | 10 | .688 |
| No. 20 Clemson | 11 | – | 7 | .611 | 25 | – | 10 | .714 |
| NC State | 11 | – | 7 | .611 | 21 | – | 12 | .636 |
| No. 10 North Carolina | 11 | – | 7 | .611 | 26 | – | 11 | .703 |
| Virginia Tech | 10 | – | 8 | .556 | 21 | – | 12 | .636 |
| Florida State | 9 | – | 9 | .500 | 23 | – | 12 | .657 |
| Louisville | 9 | – | 9 | .500 | 22 | – | 14 | .611 |
| Notre Dame | 8 | – | 10 | .444 | 21 | – | 15 | .583 |
| Syracuse | 8 | – | 10 | .444 | 23 | – | 14 | .622 |
| Boston College | 7 | – | 11 | .389 | 19 | – | 16 | .543 |
| Georgia Tech | 6 | – | 12 | .333 | 13 | – | 19 | .406 |
| Wake Forest | 4 | – | 14 | .222 | 11 | – | 20 | .355 |
| Pittsburgh | 0 | – | 18 | .000 | 8 | – | 24 | .250 |
† 2018 ACC tournament winner Rankings from AP poll

The 2017–18 Virginia Tech Hokies men's basketball team represented Virginia Polytechnic Institute and State University during the 2017–18 NCAA Division I men's basketball season. The Hokies were led by fourth-year head coach Buzz Williams and played their home games at Cassell Coliseum in Blacksburg, Virginia as members of the Atlantic Coast Conference. They finished the season 21–12, 10–8 in ACC play to finish in seventh place. They lost in the second round of the ACC tournament to Notre Dame. They received an at-large bid to the NCAA tournament where they lost in the first round to Alabama.

== Previous season ==
The Hokies finished the 2016–17 season 22–11, 10–8 in ACC play to finish in a tie for seventh place. They defeated Wake Forest in the second round of the ACC tournament before losing in the quarterfinals to Florida State. They received an invitation to the NCAA tournament as the #9 seed in the East region. There they lost to #8 Wisconsin in the first round.

== Offseason ==
=== Departures ===
| Name | Number | Pos. | Height | Weight | Year | Hometown | Reason for departure |
|---|---|---|---|---|---|---|---|
| Khadim Sy | 2 | F/C | 6'10" | 240 | Freshman | Dakar, Senegal | Transferred (later re-enrolled) |
| Seth LeDay | 3 | F | 6'7" | 200 | Junior | The Colony, TX | Transferred to East Carolina |
| Seth Allen | 4 | G | 6'1" | 190 | RS Senior | Woodbridge, VA | Graduated |
| Greg Donlon | 14 | F | 6'8" | 230 | RS Senior | Midlothian, VA | Walk-on; graduated |
| Johnny Hamilton | 22 | C | 7'0" | 230 | Senior | Rio Claro, Trinidad and Tobago | Graduate transfer to UT Arlington |
| Zach LeDay | 32 | F | 6'7" | 235 | RS Senior | Dallas, TX | Graduated |
| Matt Galloway | 33 | G | 6'3" | 205 | RS Senior | Sterling, VA | Graduated |

=== 2017 recruiting class ===
College recruiting information
| Name | Hometown | School | Height | Weight | Commit date |
|---|---|---|---|---|---|
| Nickeil Alexander-Walker #3 SG | Toronto, ON | Hamilton Heights Christian Academy | 6 ft 5 in (1.96 m) | 195 lb (88 kg) | May 5, 2016 |
| Nickeil Alexander-Walker #3 SG | Recruit ratings: Scout: Rivals: 247Sports: ESPN: | | | | |
| Wabissa Bede #17 PG | Ashburnham, MA | Cushing Academy | 6 ft 1 in (1.85 m) | 180 lb (82 kg) | Sep 28, 2016 |
| Wabissa Bede #17 PG | Recruit ratings: Scout: Rivals: 247Sports: ESPN: | | | | |
| Preston Horne; PF | Tifton, GA | Tift County High School | 6 ft 8 in (2.03 m) | 215 lb (98 kg) | Feb 6, 2017 |
| Preston Horne; PF | Recruit ratings: Scout: Rivals: 247Sports: ESPN: | | | | |
Overall recruit ranking: Scout: NA Rivals: NA 247Sports: 23 ESPN: 19
Note: In many cases, Scout, Rivals, 247Sports, On3, and ESPN may conflict in their listings of height and weight.; In these cases, the average was taken. ESPN grades are on a 100-point scale.; Sources: "Virginia Tech Commit List for 2017". Rivals.; "ESPN". ESPN.; "2017 Team Ranking". Rivals.

=== Future recruits ===
==== 2018 recruiting class ====
College recruiting information (2018)
| Name | Hometown | School | Height | Weight | Commit date |
|---|---|---|---|---|---|
| Isaiah Wilikins; SF | Wake Forest, NC | Mount Tabor High School | 6 ft 4 in (1.93 m) | 180 lb (82 kg) | Jul 30, 2016 |
| Isaiah Wilikins; SF | Recruit ratings: Scout: Rivals: 247Sports: ESPN: | | | | |
| Landers Nolley; SF | Fairburn, GA | Langston Hughes High School | 6 ft 7 in (2.01 m) | 195 lb (88 kg) | Oct 15, 2017 |
| Landers Nolley; SF | Recruit ratings: Scout: Rivals: 247Sports: ESPN: | | | | |
| Jon Kabongo; PG | Toronto, ON | Putnam Science Academy | 6 ft 3 in (1.91 m) | 160 lb (73 kg) | Oct 22, 2017 |
| Jon Kabongo; PG | Recruit ratings: Scout: Rivals: 247Sports: ESPN: | | | | |
Overall recruit ranking: Scout: NA Rivals: NA 247Sports: 23 ESPN: 19
Note: In many cases, Scout, Rivals, 247Sports, On3, and ESPN may conflict in their listings of height and weight.; In these cases, the average was taken. ESPN grades are on a 100-point scale.; Sources: "Virginia Tech Commit List for 2018". Rivals.; "ESPN". ESPN.; "2018 Team Ranking". Rivals.

== Roster ==
2017–18 Virginia Tech Hokies men's basketball team
Players
Coaches

| Pos. | # | Name | Height | Weight | Year | Previous school | Hometown |
|---|---|---|---|---|---|---|---|
| G | 1 | Tyrie Jackson | 6 ft 1 in (1.85 m) | 205 lb (93 kg) | So | Tift County | Tifton, Georgia |
| F/C | 2 | Khadim Sy | 6 ft 10 in (2.08 m) | 240 lb (109 kg) | So | Oak Hill Academy | Dakar, Senegal |
| G | 3 | Wabissa Bede | 6 ft 1 in (1.85 m) | 195 lb (88 kg) | Fr | Cushing Academy | North Andover, Massachusetts |
| G | 4 | Nickeil Alexander-Walker | 6 ft 5 in (1.96 m) | 210 lb (95 kg) | Fr | Hamilton Heights Christian Academy | Toronto, Ontario |
| G | 5 | Justin Robinson | 6 ft 2 in (1.88 m) | 190 lb (86 kg) | Jr | St. James School (MD) | Manassas, Virginia |
| G | 10 | Justin Bibbs | 6 ft 5 in (1.96 m) | 220 lb (100 kg) | Sr | Montverde Academy | Dayton, Ohio |
| G | 11 | Devin Wilson | 6 ft 4 in (1.93 m) | 195 lb (88 kg) | RS Sr | Montour | McKees Rocks, Pennsylvania |
| G | 13 | Ahmed Hill | 6 ft 5 in (1.96 m) | 205 lb (93 kg) | RS Jr | Aquinas | Augusta, Georgia |
| G | 14 | P.J. Horne | 6 ft 5 in (1.96 m) | 215 lb (98 kg) | Fr | Tift County | Tifton, Georgia |
| G/F | 15 | Chris Clarke | 6 ft 6 in (1.98 m) | 210 lb (95 kg) | Jr | Cape Henry | Virginia Beach, Virginia |
| F | 21 | Nick Fullard | 6 ft 10 in (2.08 m) | 235 lb (107 kg) | Sr | St. Mary's Ryken; Belmont Abbey | La Plata, Maryland |
| G | 22 | Justin Ammerman (W) | 6 ft 3 in (1.91 m) | 185 lb (84 kg) | Jr | Bayard Rustin | West Chester, Pennsylvania |
| F | 24 | Kerry Blackshear Jr. | 6 ft 10 in (2.08 m) | 260 lb (118 kg) | RS So | Maynard Evans | Orlando, Florida |
| G/F | 42 | Ty Outlaw | 6 ft 6 in (1.98 m) | 220 lb (100 kg) | RS Jr | Person/Lee College | Roxboro, North Carolina |

Head coach

- Buzz Williams (Oklahoma City)

Assistant coach(es)

- Steve Roccaforte (Lamar)
- Jamie McNeilly (New Orleans)
- Christian Webster (Harvard)

Legend

- (C) Team captain
- (S) Suspended
- (I) Ineligible
- (W) Walk-on
- Injured
- Current redshirt

Roster

== Schedule and results ==
| Date time, TV | Rank^{#} | Opponent^{#} | Result | Record | High points | High rebounds | High assists | Site (attendance) city, state |
Exhibition
| November 5, 2017*; 2:00 pm | | at South Carolina; Hoops 4 Hurricane Relief | W 86–67 | – | 18 – Alexander-Walker | 8 – Blackshear Jr. | 8 – Robinson | Colonial Life Arena (N/A); Columbia, SC |
Non-conference regular season
| November 10, 2017*; 6:00 pm, ACCN Extra | | Detroit; 2K Sports Classic | W 111–79 | 1–0 | 24 – Alexander-Walker | 9 – Hill | 6 – Robinson | Cassell Coliseum (9,275); Blacksburg, VA |
| November 12, 2017*; 7:00 pm, ACCN Extra | | The Citadel; 2K Sports Classic | W 132–93 | 2–0 | 29 – Alexander-Walker | 15 – Blackshear Jr. | 8 – Blackshear Jr. | Cassell Coliseum (9,275); Blacksburg, VA |
| November 16, 2017*; 7:00 pm, ESPN2 | | vs. Saint Louis; 2K Sports Classic semifinals | L 71–77 | 2–1 | 26 – Hill | 12 – Clarke | 4 – Robinson | Madison Square Garden (6,104); New York, NY |
| November 17, 2017*; 5:00 pm, ESPN2 | | vs. Washington; 2K Sports Classic 3rd place game | W 103–79 | 3–1 | 30 – Bibbs | 7 – Tied | 5 – Robinson | Madison Square Garden (6,173); New York, NY |
| November 21, 2017*; 7:00 pm, ACCN Extra | | Houston Baptist | W 99–73 | 4–1 | 25 – Bibbs | 7 – Hill | 7 – Robinson | Cassell Coliseum (4,951); Blacksburg, VA |
| November 25, 2017*; 1:00 pm, ACCN Extra | | Morehead State | W 96–63 | 5–1 | 18 – Alexander-Walker | 9 – Blackshear Jr. | 5 – Clarke | Cassell Coliseum (5,390); Blacksburg, VA |
| November 28, 2017*; 9:15 pm, ESPN2 | | Iowa; ACC–Big Ten Challenge | W 79–55 | 6–1 | 18 – Hill | 10 – Blackshear Jr. | 6 – Robinson | Cassell Coliseum (7,101); Blacksburg, VA |
| December 2, 2017*; 2:00 pm, SECN Plus | | at Ole Miss | W 83–80 ^{OT} | 7–1 | 17 – Blackshear Jr. | 12 – Clarke | 8 – Robinson | The Pavilion (6,297); Oxford, MS |
| December 6, 2017*; 6:00 pm, ACCN Extra | | Radford; Rivalry | W 95–68 | 8–1 | 20 – Tied | 6 – Tied | 9 – Robinson | Cassell Coliseum (7,265); Blacksburg, VA |
| December 10, 2017*; 3:00 pm, ACCN Extra | | Maryland Eastern Shore | W 93–40 | 9–1 | 18 – Clarke | 8 – Tied | 5 – Robinson | Cassell Coliseum (6,578); Blacksburg, VA |
| December 16, 2017*; 2:00 pm, ESPN2 | | at No. 8 Kentucky | L 86–93 | 9–2 | 20 – Hill | 11 – Clarke | 9 – Robinson | Rupp Arena (22,690); Lexington, KY |
| December 19, 2017*; 7:00 pm, ACCN Extra | | Presbyterian | W 63–55 | 10–2 | 12 – Hill | 8 – Clarke | 4 – Robinson | Cassell Coliseum (5,043); Blacksburg, VA |
| December 28, 2017*; 12:00 pm, ACCN Extra | | North Carolina A&T | W 76–59 | 11–2 | 14 – Hill | 8 – Alexander-Walker | 4 – Blackshear Jr. | Cassell Coliseum (6,979); Blacksburg, VA |
ACC regular season
| December 31, 2017; 6:00 pm, ESPNU | | at Syracuse | L 56–68 | 11–3 (0–1) | 19 – Alexander-Walker | 10 – Clarke | 5 – Robinson | Carrier Dome (20,688); Syracuse, NY |
| January 3, 2018; 9:00 pm, ACCN | | No. 8 Virginia; Commonwealth Classic | L 52–78 | 11–4 (0–2) | 14 – Blackshear Jr. | 6 – Clarke | 3 – Clarke | Cassell Coliseum (5,945); Blacksburg, VA |
| January 6, 2018; 12:00 pm, ACCN | | Pittsburgh | W 81–67 | 12–4 (1–2) | 31 – Blackshear Jr. | 7 – Clarke | 10 – Robinson | Cassell Coliseum (5,478); Blacksburg, VA |
| January 10, 2018; 7:00 pm, RSN | | at Wake Forest | W 83–75 | 13–4 (2–2) | 21 – Hill | 6 – Tied | 7 – Robinson | LJVM Coliseum (8,260); Winston-Salem, NC |
| January 13, 2018; 4:00 pm, ESPN2 | | at Louisville | L 86–94 | 13–5 (2–3) | 23 – Robinson | 12 – Blackshear | 5 – Clarke | KFC Yum! Center (16,798); Louisville, KY |
| January 20, 2018; 12:00 pm, ESPN2 | | Florida State | L 82–91 | 13–6 (2–4) | 26 – Robinson | 5 – Tied | 6 – Robinson | Cassell Coliseum (9,275); Blacksburg, VA |
| January 22, 2018; 7:00 pm, ESPN | | No. 10 North Carolina | W 80–69 | 14–6 (3–4) | 19 – Robinson | 8 – Clarke | 4 – 3 tied | Cassell Coliseum (9,275); Blacksburg, VA |
| January 27, 2018; 8:00 pm, ESPN2 | | at Notre Dame | W 80–75 | 15–6 (4–4) | 20 – Bibbs | 14 – Clarke | 7 – Robinson | Edmund P. Joyce Center (9,149); South Bend, IN |
| January 31, 2018; 9:00 pm, RSN | | at Boston College | W 85–80 ^{OT} | 16–6 (5–4) | 20 – Blackshear Jr. | 9 – Clarke | 12 – Robinson | Conte Forum (6,297); Chestnut Hill, MA |
| February 3, 2018; 2:00 pm, ESPN | | Miami (FL) | L 75–84 | 16–7 (5–5) | 22 – Robinson | 7 – Tied | 4 – Tied | Cassell Coliseum (9,275); Blacksburg, VA |
| February 7, 2018; 9:00 pm, RSN | | NC State | W 85–75 | 17–7 (6–5) | 32 – Robinson | 4 – Tied | 4 – Robinson | Cassell Coliseum (9,275); Blacksburg, VA |
| February 10, 2018; 6:15 pm, ESPN | | at No. 2 Virginia; Commonwealth Classic/College Gameday | W 61–60 ^{OT} | 18–7 (7–5) | 20 – Robinson | 7 – D. Wilson | 7 – Robinson | John Paul Jones Arena (14,623); Charlottesville VA |
| February 14, 2018; 7:00 pm, ESPN2 | | at No. 12 Duke | L 52–74 | 18–8 (7–6) | 15 – Bibbs | 4 – Blackshear | 5 – Robinson | Cameron Indoor Stadium (9,314); Durham, NC |
| February 17, 2018; 12:00 pm, ESPN2 | | at Georgia Tech | W 76–56 | 19–8 (8–6) | 18 – Robinson | 8 – Blackshear Jr. | 4 – 3 tied | Hank McCamish Pavilion (8,600); Atlanta, GA |
| February 21, 2018; 7:00 pm, RSN | | No. 15 Clemson | W 65–58 | 20–8 (9–6) | 14 – Robinson | 6 – Tied | 5 – Robinson | Cassell Coliseum (9,275); Blacksburg, VA |
| February 24, 2018; 1:00 pm, CBS | | Louisville | L 68–75 | 20–9 (9–7) | 16 – Robinson | 5 – Blackshear Jr. | 4 – Robinson | Cassell Coliseum (9,275); Blacksburg, VA |
| February 26, 2018; 7:00 pm, ESPN | | No. 5 Duke | W 64–63 | 21–9 (10–7) | 17 – Alexander-Walker | 6 – Blackshear Jr. | 5 – Robinson | Cassell Coliseum (9,275); Blacksburg, VA |
| March 3, 2018; 12:00 pm, ESPN2 | | at Miami (FL) | L 68–69 | 21–10 (10–8) | 18 – Robinson | 5 – Tied | 6 – Robinson | Watsco Center (7,164); Coral Gables |
ACC tournament
| March 7, 2018; 7:00 pm, ESPN2 | (7) | vs. (10) Notre Dame; Second Round | L 65–71 | 21–11 | 15 – Tied | 8 – Blackshear Jr. | 7 – Robinson | Barclays Center (17,732); Brooklyn, NY |
NCAA tournament
| March 15, 2018*; 9:20 pm, TNT | (8 E) | vs. (9 E) Alabama; First Round | L 83–86 | 21–12 | 19 – Robinson | 4 – Horne | 7 – Robinson | PPG Paints Arena (18,715); Pittsburgh, PA |
*Non-conference game. ^{#}Rankings from AP Poll. (#) Tournament seedings in parentheses. E=East. All times are in Eastern Time.

== Rankings ==
Ranking movements Legend: ██ Increase in ranking ██ Decrease in ranking — = Not ranked RV = Received votes
| | Week | | | | | | | | | | | | | | | | | | |
| Poll | Pre | 1 | 2 | 3 | 4 | 5 | 6 | 7 | 8 | 9 | 10 | 11 | 12 | 13 | 14 | 15 | 16 | 17 | Final |
|---|---|---|---|---|---|---|---|---|---|---|---|---|---|---|---|---|---|---|---|
| AP | RV | RV | — | — | RV | RV | RV | RV | — | — | — | — | — | — | — | RV | RV | RV | RV |
| Coaches | RV | RV | RV | RV | RV | RV | RV | RV | RV | RV | — | — | — | RV | — | RV | RV | RV | RV |

*AP does not release post-NCAA Tournament rankings
