= Kimmel Arena =

Arena at UNC Asheville in Asheville, North Carolina

- Interactive map of Kimmel Arena
- Full name: Kimmel Arena (Wilma M. Sherrill Center)
- Location: 227 Campus Drive; Asheville, NC 28804
- Coordinates: 35.6181°N 82.5689°W
- Owner: University of North Carolina at Asheville
- Operator: University of North Carolina at Asheville
- Capacity: 3,200
- Surface: Hardwood

Construction
- Groundbreaking: April 30, 2008
- Opened: November 7, 2011
- Cost: $7 million ($10 million in 2025 dollars)
- Architects: Populous; Bowers, Ellis and Watson
- General contractor: Shelco Inc.

Tenant
- UNC Asheville Bulldogs (2011–present)

Kimmel Arena is the home of the UNC Asheville Bulldogs basketball programs, both men and women's. It is a 3,200-seat arena located on the campus of the University of North Carolina at Asheville in Asheville, North Carolina. Kimmel Arena, named for local businessman Joe Kimmel, is part of the much larger Wilma M. Sherrill Center, which is a 133,500-square-foot (12,400 m^{2}) facility. The arena held its first games, both exhibitions, on November 7, 2011, and formally opened November 13, 2011, as UNC Asheville hosted the University of North Carolina Tar Heels. It replaces the Justice Center as UNCA's home court, but the latter will remain as a training facility and physical education complex.

== Events ==
Past events include; Bulldog Basketball, the Gala Gymnastics Meet, Colt Ford - music concert, Florida Georgia Line – music concert, the Carolina Day Holiday classic basketball tournament, 2012 Big South Conference men's basketball tournament, American Bridge Club regional tournament, and Gluten Free Food Expo.

== See also ==
- List of NCAA Division I basketball arenas
