= 2016–17 Longwood Lancers men's basketball team =

American college basketball season

2016–17 Longwood Lancers men's basketball
- Conference: Big South Conference
- Record: 6–24 (3–15 Big South)
- Head coach: Jayson Gee (4th season)
- Associate head coach: Jake Luhn (4th season)
- Assistant coaches: Cody Anderson (2nd season); Ron Bradley (1st season)
- Captains: Darrion Allen; Isaac Belton; Damarion Geter; Khris Lane
- Home arena: Willett Hall

2016–17 Big South men's basketball standings
	Conf.				Overall
Team	W		L	PCT	W		L	PCT
Winthrop †	15	–	3	.833	26	–	7	.788
UNC Asheville	15	–	3	.833	23	–	10	.697
Liberty	14	–	4	.778	21	–	14	.600
Gardner–Webb	11	–	7	.611	19	–	14	.576
High Point	9	–	9	.500	15	–	16	.484
Radford	8	–	10	.444	14	–	18	.438
Campbell	7	–	11	.389	19	–	18	.514
Charleston Southern	7	–	11	.389	12	–	19	.387
Longwood	3	–	15	.167	6	–	24	.200
Presbyterian	1	–	17	.056	5	–	25	.167
† 2017 Big South tournament winner

The 2016–17 Longwood Lancers men's basketball team represented Longwood University during the 2016–17 NCAA Division I men's basketball season. They were led by head coach Jayson Gee, in his fourth season, and played their home games at Willett Hall in Farmville, Virginia as members of the Big South Conference. They finished the season 6–24, 3–15 in Big South play to finish in ninth place. They lost in the first round of the Big South tournament to Charleston Southern.

== Previous season ==
The 2015–16 Lancers finished the 2015–16 season 10–23, 5–13 in Big South play to finish in a four-way tie for eighth place. They defeated Radford in the first round of the Big South tournament to advance to the quarterfinals where they lost to High Point.

=== Departures ===
Name	Number	Pos.	Height	Weight	Year	Hometown	Notes
Tra'Vaughn White	0	G	5'10"	190	RS Senior	Kansas City, Kansas	Graduated
Lotanna Nwogbo	10	F/C	6'8"	255	RS Senior	Lithonia, Georgia	Graduated
Kanayo Obi-Rapu Jr.	11	G	6'3"	190	Sophomore	Greensboro, North Carolina	Transferred to East Tennessee State
Victor Dorsey	14	F	6'9"	200	Sophomore	Akron, Ohio	Not returning to team
Shaquille Johnson	21	G/F	6'5"	220	Senior	Atlanta, Georgia	Graduated
Al Burge	23	G	6'4"	190	Freshman	Garfield Heights, Ohio	Transfer to University of Charleston

=== Coaching changes ===
On June 4, 2016, assistant coach Adam Williams left to become the head coach at Division II Salem International University. On July 7, Gee announce that former Radford head coach Ron Bradley would be named as an assistant. On September 1, Anderson was promoted from director of basketball operations, replacing Samba Johnson.

== Class of 2016 signees ==
College recruiting information
Name	Hometown	School	Height	Weight	Commit date
Juan Muñoz; PG	Raleigh, NC	Panther Creek High School	5 ft 11 in (1.80 m)	155 lb (70 kg)	August 9, 2015
Juan Muñoz; PG	Recruit ratings: ESPN: (59)				
JaShaun Smith; SF	Garner, NC	Garner Magnet High School	6 ft 6 in (1.98 m)	190 lb (86 kg)	November 15, 2015
JaShaun Smith; SF	Recruit ratings: No ratings found				
Overall recruit ranking:
Note: In many cases, Scout, Rivals, 247Sports, On3, and ESPN may conflict in their listings of height and weight.; In these cases, the average was taken. ESPN grades are on a 100-point scale.; Sources:

=== Incoming transfers ===
Name	Number	Pos.	Height	Weight	Year	Hometown	Previous School
Isaiah Walton	1	G	6'4"	174	RS Sophomore	Oberlin, OH	Junior college transfer from Iowa Western Community College.
Kendrick Thompson	5	G	6'2"	170	Junior	Cleveland, TN	Junior college transfer from Daytona State College.
BK Ashe	10	G	6'0"	170	Senior	Washington, D.C.	Transferred from Mount St. Mary's University. Under NCAA transfer rules, he will have to sit out a year, and will have one year of eligibility remaining.
Jahleem Montague	11	F	6'8"	210	Sophomore	Atlantic City, NJ	Junior college transfer from Palm Beach State College.
Obi Romeo	20	F	6'10"	245	Junior	White Sulphur Springs, WV	Junior college transfer from Pensacola State College.

== Roster ==
2016–17 Longwood Lancers men's basketball team
Players
Coaches

Pos.	#	Name	Height	Weight	Year	Previous school	Hometown
G	0	Dominic Ezeani (W)	5 ft 11 in (1.8 m)	165 lb (75 kg)	Fr	Our Lady of Good Counsel	Silver Spring, Maryland
G	1	Isaiah Walton	6 ft 4 in (1.93 m)	185 lb (84 kg)	RS So	Elyria HS/Iowa Western CC/UC Davis	Oberlin, Ohio
G	2	Bryan Gee (injured)	6 ft 0 in (1.83 m)	180 lb (82 kg)	RS So	Cornerstone Christian	Cleveland, Ohio
G	3	Darrion Allen (C)	6 ft 2 in (1.88 m)	176 lb (80 kg)	Sr	Blanche Ely HS	Pompano Beach, Florida
F	4	Khris Lane (C)	6 ft 6 in (1.98 m)	245 lb (111 kg)	RS Jr	Benedictine HS/Drexel	Richmond, Virginia
G	5	Kendrick Thompson (I)	6 ft 2 in (1.88 m)	170 lb (77 kg)	Jr	Cleveland HS/Daytona State	Cleveland, Tennessee
G	10	B.K. Ashe (I) (redshirt)	6 ft 1 in (1.85 m)	160 lb (73 kg)	Sr	Friendship Collegiate/Mount St. Mary's	Washington, D.C.
F	11	Jahleem Montague (injured) (redshirt)	6 ft 8 in (2.03 m)	230 lb (104 kg)	So	Atlantic City HS/Palm Beach State	Atlantic City, New Jersey
G	12	Juan Munoz (injured) (redshirt)	5 ft 11 in (1.8 m)	165 lb (75 kg)	Fr	Panther Creek HS	Raleigh, North Carolina
G	15	Isaac Belton (C)	6 ft 4 in (1.93 m)	205 lb (93 kg)	Sr	Virginia Episcopal/Fork Union Military	Salem, Virginia
F	20	Obi Romeo	6 ft 10 in (2.08 m)	245 lb (111 kg)	Jr	Greenbrier East HS/Saint Joseph's	White Sulphur Springs, West Virginia
F	21	JaShaun Smith	6 ft 5 in (1.96 m)	200 lb (91 kg)	Fr	Legacy Charter School	Garner, North Carolina
F	24	Damarion Geter (injured) (C)	6 ft 8 in (2.03 m)	235 lb (107 kg)	RS Jr	Dunbar HS	Dayton, Ohio
G/F	30	Chris Shields	6 ft 8 in (2.03 m)	210 lb (95 kg)	So	Hedgesville HS/Fishburne Military	Hedgesville, West Virginia

Head coach

- Jayson Gee (University of Charleston)

Assistant coach(es)

- Jake Luhn (UMass Boston)
- Cody Anderson (Georgia)
- Ron Bradley (Eastern Nazarene)

Legend

- (C) Team captain
- (S) Suspended
- (I) Ineligible
- (W) Walk-on
- Injured
- Current redshirt

Roster
Last update: August 30, 2016

== Schedule and results ==
Date time, TV	Rank^{#}	Opponent^{#}	Result	Record	High points	High rebounds	High assists	Site (attendance) city, state
Exhibition game
Nov 5, 2016*; 5:00 pm, BSN		Hampden–Sydney; Crosstown Showdown	W 93–85 ^{OT}		24 – Allen	9 – Walton	8 – Walton	Willett Hall (1,900); Farmville, VA
Non-conference regular season
Nov 13, 2016*; 2:00 pm, BSN		Maine	L 58–80	0–1	18 – Allen	8 – Lane	5 – Thompson	Willett Hall (1,128); Farmville, VA
Nov 15, 2016*; 11:00 am, ESPN2		at Stephen F. Austin; College Hoops Tip-Off Marathon	W 66–60	0–2	15 – Walton	7 – Allen	4 – Thompson	William R. Johnson Coliseum (5,944); Nacogdoches, TX
Nov 18, 2016*; 7:00 pm, BSN		Salem International	W 87–74	1–2	24 – Lane	14 – Lane	7 – Walton	Willett Hall (1,187); Farmville, VA
Nov 23, 2016*; 7:00 pm		at Saint Francis (PA)	L 72–87	1–3	21 – Allen	9 – Lane	4 – Thompson	DeGol Arena (506); Loretto, PA
Nov 28, 2016*; 7:00 pm, BSN		Dartmouth	W 86–80	2–3	23 – Walton	11 – Lane	7 – Thompson	Willett Hall (1,018); Farmville, VA
Dec 3, 2016*; 5:00 pm, BSN		James Madison	L 59–71	2–4	13 – Allen	6 – Lane	4 – Thompson	Willett Hall (1,508); Farmville, VA
Dec 9, 2016*; 7:30 pm, FS1		at No. 10 Creighton	L 58–113	2–5	12 – Tied	6 – Shields	4 – Walton	CenturyLink Center Omaha (16,697); Omaha, NE
Dec 12, 2016*; 7:00 pm		at George Mason	L 60–97	2–6	16 – Allen	8 – Lane	3 – Walton	EagleBank Arena (3,712); Fairfax, VA
Dec 14, 2016*; 7:00 pm, BSN		Averett	W 86–67	3–6	24 – Allen	11 – Lane	4 – Walton	Willett Hall (482); Farmville, VA
Dec 19, 2016*; 7:00 pm, ESPN3		at Ball State	L 45–61	3–7	11 – Smith	10 – Lane	2 – Gee	Worthen Arena (2,115); Muncie, IN
Dec 21, 2016*; 5:00 pm, FSSW		at Texas Tech	L 60–91	3–8	15 – Shields	4 – Smith	5 – Walton	United Supermarkets Arena (9,057); Lubbock, TX
Big South regular season
Dec 29, 2016; 7:00 pm, BSN		Campbell	W 79–77	4–8 (1–0)	30 – Lane	8 – Lane	7 – Walton	Willett Hall (718); Farmville, VA
Dec 31, 2016; 7:00 pm, BSN		at High Point	W 60–55	5–8 (2–0)	18 – Lane	9 – Walton	2 – Tied	Millis Center (712); High Point, NC
Jan 4, 2017; 7:00 pm, Shentel/BSN		Presbyterian	W 79–76	6–8 (3–0)	22 – Walton	6 – Tied	4 – Gee	Willett Hall (518); Farmville, VA
Jan 7, 2017; 5:00 pm, BSN		at Winthrop	L 65–83	6–9 (3–1)	14 – Lane	6 – Lane	2 – Gee	Winthrop Coliseum (1,155); Rock Hill, SC
Jan 11, 2017; 7:00 pm, BSN		at UNC Asheville	L 68–89	6–10 (3–2)	32 – Lane	8 – Lane	3 – Belton	Kimmel Arena (1,262); Asheville, NC
Jan 14, 2017; 2:00 pm, Shentel/BSN		Gardner–Webb	L 79–85	6–11 (3–3)	22 – Allen	11 – Lane	6 – Walton	Willett Hall (1,118); Farmville, VA
Jan 19, 2017; 7:00 pm, Shentel/BSN		Radford	L 60–72	6–12 (3–4)	18 – Lane	8 – Lane	4 – Gee	Willett Hall (1,318); Farmville, VA
Jan 21, 2017; 5:00 pm, BSN		at Charleston Southern	L 61–76	6–13 (3–5)	20 – Walton	7 – Allen	3 – Gee	CSU Field House (727); North Charleston, SC
Jan 26, 2017; 7:00 pm, Shentel/BSN		Liberty	L 62–93	6–14 (3–6)	20 – Allen	5 – Walton	3 – Walton	Willett Hall (1,614); Farmville, VA
Jan 28, 2017; 5:00 pm, BSN		at Presbyterian	L 62–71	6–15 (3–7)	16 – Lane	11 – Lane	6 – Walton	Templeton Center (707); Clinton, SC
Feb 1, 2017; 7:00 pm, Shentel/BSN		High Point	L 68–92	6–16 (3–8)	24 – Lane	7 – Lane	6 – Walton	Willett Hall (842); Farmville, VA
Feb 4, 2017; 5:00 pm, ASN		at Gardner–Webb	L 64–90	6–17 (3–9)	20 – Walton	8 – Smith	3 – Tied	Paul Porter Arena (1,029); Boiling Springs, NC
Feb 9, 2017; 7:00 pm, BSN		at Campbell	L 79–83	6–18 (3–10)	28 – Walton	9 – Lane	3 – Tied	Gore Arena (1,241); Buies Creek, NC
Feb 11, 2017; 5:00 pm, Shentel/BSN		UNC Asheville	L 69–91	6–19 (3–11)	17 – Allen	8 – Smith	3 – Tied	Willett Hall (1,312); Farmville, VA
Feb 15, 2017; 7:00 pm, Shentel/BSN		Winthrop	L 63–83	6–20 (3–12)	18 – Allen	5 – Lane	2 – Walton	Willett Hall (1,011); Farmville, VA
Feb 18, 2017; 5:00 pm, ESPN3		at Radford	L 72–79	6–21 (3–13)	32 – Lane	7 – Walton	6 – Allen	Dedmon Center (1,783); Radford, VA
Feb 23, 2017; 7:00 pm, BSN		at Liberty	L 45–61	6–22 (3–14)	14 – Lane	5 – Tied	3 – Lane	Vines Center (2,789); Lynchburg, VA
Feb 25, 2017; 2:00 pm, Shentel/BSN		Charleston Southern	L 78–86	6–23 (3–15)	27 – Lane	10 – Lane	7 – Walton	Willett Hall (1,088); Farmville, VA
Big South Conference tournament
Feb 28, 2017; 7:00 pm, BSN	(9)	at (8) Charleston Southern; First round	L 74–79	6–24	24 – Tied	9 – Lane	5 – Belton	CSU Field House (815); North Charleston, SC
*Non-conference game. ^{#}Rankings from AP Poll. (#) Tournament seedings in parentheses. All times are in Eastern Time..
