= 2016–17 Liberty Flames basketball team =

American college basketball season

2016–17 Liberty Flames basketball

Coach John McLendon Classic champions

CIT, Quarterfinals
- Conference: Big South Conference
- Record: 21–14 (14–4 Big South)
- Head coach: Ritchie McKay (2nd (4th overall) season)
- Assistant coaches: Brad Soucie (2nd (4th) season); Kyle Getter (2nd season); Matt Olinger (1st season)
- Home arena: Vines Center

2016–17 Big South men's basketball standings
	Conf.				Overall
Team	W		L	PCT	W		L	PCT
Winthrop †	15	–	3	.833	26	–	7	.788
UNC Asheville	15	–	3	.833	23	–	10	.697
Liberty	14	–	4	.778	21	–	14	.600
Gardner–Webb	11	–	7	.611	19	–	14	.576
High Point	9	–	9	.500	15	–	16	.484
Radford	8	–	10	.444	14	–	18	.438
Campbell	7	–	11	.389	19	–	18	.514
Charleston Southern	7	–	11	.389	12	–	19	.387
Longwood	3	–	15	.167	6	–	24	.200
Presbyterian	1	–	17	.056	5	–	25	.167
† 2017 Big South tournament winner

The 2016–17 Liberty Flames men's basketball team represented Liberty University in the 2016–17 NCAA Division I men's basketball season. The team played its home games in Lynchburg, Virginia for the 27th consecutive season at Vines Center, with a capacity of 8,085. The team was led by Ritchie McKay, who was in his fourth season, but second season since his return to the program. They were members of the Big South Conference. They finished the season 21–14, 14–4 in Big South play to finish in a third place. They were upset in Quarterfinals of the Big South tournament by Radford. They were invited to the CollegeInsider.com Tournament where they defeated Norfolk State in the first round to be champions of the Coach John McLendon Classic. In the Second Round they defeated Samford before losing in the quarterfinals to UMBC.

== Previous season ==
The Flames finished the 2015–16 season 13–19, 10–8 in Big South play to finish in a tie for fifth place. They lost in the quarterfinals of the Big South tournament to UNC Asheville.

== Departures ==
Name	Number	Pos.	Height	Weight	Year	Hometown	Notes
Anthony Fields	0	Guard	6'0"	160	Senior	Detroit, Michigan	Graduated
Hansel Atencia	4	Guard	5'10"	175	Freshman	Bucaramanga, Colombia	Transferred to The Master's College
Theo Johnson	14	Guard/Forward	6'7"	205	Junior	Sacramento, California	Transferred to Cal State Dominguez Hills Toros Suspended before the 2015–16 season.
Evan Maxwell	15	Center	6'10"	245	Sophomore	Clarks Summit, Pennsylvania	Transferred to Kansas

== 2016–17 Newcomers ==
College recruiting information
Name	Hometown	School	Height	Weight	Commit date
Xzavier Barmore; PG	Seneca, South Carolina	Seneca Senior High School	6 ft 1 in (1.85 m)	165 lb (75 kg)	Jul 20, 2015
Xzavier Barmore; PG	Recruit ratings: No ratings found				
Georgie Pacheco-Ortiz; SG	Ponce, Puerto Rico	Deep Run High School	6 ft 2 in (1.88 m)	170 lb (77 kg)	Mar 10, 2016
Georgie Pacheco-Ortiz; SG	Recruit ratings: No ratings found				
Brock Gardner; SF	Chandler, Arizona	Tri-City Christian Academy	6 ft 7 in (2.01 m)	210 lb (95 kg)	
Brock Gardner; SF	Recruit ratings: ESPN:				
Josiah Talbert; PF	Olathe, Kansas	Olathe East High School	6 ft 9 in (2.06 m)	210 lb (95 kg)	Jun 14, 2015
Josiah Talbert; PF	Recruit ratings: No ratings found				
Brody Hicks; SG	Roanoke, Virginia	Cave Spring High School	6 ft 4 in (1.93 m)	188 lb (85 kg)	Nov 24, 2015
Brody Hicks; SG	Recruit ratings: No ratings found				
Scottie James; F	Tarpon Springs, Florida	Tarpon Springs HS / Bradley	6 ft 8 in (2.03 m)	225 lb (102 kg)	
Scottie James; F	Recruit ratings: No ratings found				
Zach Farquhar; G	Cincinnati, Ohio	Sycamore High School	5 ft 9 in (1.75 m)	160 lb (73 kg)	
Zach Farquhar; G	Recruit ratings: No ratings found				
Ray Chen; G	Miaoli, Taiwan	Gaston HS / Belmont Abbey	6 ft 1 in (1.85 m)	185 lb (84 kg)	
Ray Chen; G	Recruit ratings: No ratings found				
Overall recruit ranking:
Note: In many cases, Scout, Rivals, 247Sports, On3, and ESPN may conflict in their listings of height and weight.; In these cases, the average was taken. ESPN grades are on a 100-point scale.; Sources: "2016 Team Ranking". Rivals.

== Roster ==
2016–17 Liberty Flames men's basketball team
Players
Coaches

Pos.	#	Name	Height	Weight	Year	Previous school	Hometown
F	0	Myo Baxter-Bell	6 ft 5 in (1.96 m)	255 lb (116 kg)	RS Fr	Chaminade Julieen High School	Dayton, Ohio
G	1	Caleb Homesley	6 ft 4 in (1.93 m)	175 lb (79 kg)	So	Porter Ridge High School	Indian Trail, North Carolina
G/F	2	A. C. Reid	6 ft 5 in (1.96 m)	190 lb (86 kg)	Jr	Smithson Valley High School	Spring Branch, Texas
G	3	Lovell Cabbil	6 ft 3 in (1.91 m)	155 lb (70 kg)	So	Mansfield Summit High School	Arlington, Texas
G	4	Xzavier Barmore	6 ft 0 in (1.83 m)	165 lb (75 kg)	Fr	Seneca Senior High School	Seneca, South Carolina
G/F	5	Ryan Kemrite	6 ft 4 in (1.93 m)	200 lb (91 kg)	RS Jr	Satch Homeschool	Conroe, Texas
G	11	Georgie Pacheco-Ortiz	6 ft 1 in (1.85 m)	170 lb (77 kg)	Fr	Deep Run High School	Ponce, Puerto Rico
F	12	Brock Gardner	6 ft 7 in (2.01 m)	210 lb (95 kg)	Fr	Tri-City Christian Academy	Chandler, Arizona
G	13	Ray Chen	6 ft 1 in (1.85 m)	185 lb (84 kg)	GS	Belmont Abbey	Miaoli, Taiwan
G	14	Brody Hicks (W)	6 ft 3 in (1.91 m)	188 lb (85 kg)	Fr	Cave Spring High School	Roanoke, Virginia
G	15	Zach Farquhar	5 ft 9 in (1.75 m)	160 lb (73 kg)	RS So	Sycamore High School	Cincinnati, Ohio
G	22	John Dawson	6 ft 2 in (1.88 m)	205 lb (93 kg)	RS Sr	Marquette	Clovis, New Mexico
F	24	Ezra Talbert	6 ft 8 in (2.03 m)	190 lb (86 kg)	RS So	Olathe East High School	Olathe, Kansas
F	31	Scottie James (redshirt)	6 ft 8 in (2.03 m)	225 lb (102 kg)	So	Bradley	Tarpon Springs, Florida
F	34	Josiah Talbert	6 ft 8 in (2.03 m)	210 lb (95 kg)	Fr	Olathe East High School	Olathe, Kansas
G	44	Ryan Hiepler (W)	6 ft 0 in (1.83 m)	180 lb (82 kg)	So	Oaks Christian High	Westlake Village, California

Head coach

- Ritchie McKay (Seattle Pacific)

Assistant coach(es)

- Brad Soucie (Christian Heritage)
- Kyle Getter (Hanover College)
- Vic Sfera (Memphis)

Legend

- (C) Team captain
- (S) Suspended
- (I) Ineligible
- (W) Walk-on
- Injured
- Current redshirt

- Roster is subject to change as/if players transfer or leave the program for other reasons.

== Schedule and results ==
Date time, TV	Rank^{#}	Opponent^{#}	Result	Record	High points	High rebounds	High assists	Site (attendance) city, state
Non-conference regular season
Nov 11, 2016*; 8:35 pm		Cairn	W 81–53	1–0	15 – Dawson	8 – Homesley	5 – Cabbil	Vines Center (5,449); Lynchburg, VA
Nov 15, 2016*; 8:00 pm		VCU	L 59–64	1–1	14 – Dawson	4 – Tied	2 – Tied	Vines Center (3,289); Lynchburg, VA
Nov 19, 2016*; 7:00 pm		at No. 6 Indiana; Indiana Classic	L 48–87	1–2	8 – Chen	3 – Tied	3 – Homesley	Assembly Hall (Bloomington) (12,537); Bloomington, IN
Nov 21, 2016*; 6:00 pm		UMass Lowell; Indiana Classic	W 84–77	2–2	21 – Kemrite	7 – Homesley	5 – Homesley	Vines Center (1,050); Lynchburg, VA
Nov 23, 2016*; 2:00 pm		Mississippi Valley State; Indiana Classic	W 70–55	3–1	22 – Homesley	6 – Homesley	4 – Tied	Vines Center (1,176); Lynchburg, VA
Nov 26, 2016*; 4:00 pm		at William & Mary	L 70–79	3–3	15 – Dawson	4 – Tied	7 – Dawson	William & Mary Hall (3,039); Williamsburg, VA
Nov 29, 2016*; 7:00 pm, LFSN		Central Penn; Indiana Classic	W 62–48	4–3	15 – Homesley	11 – Homesley	3 – Dawson	Vines Center (1,395); Lynchburg, VA
Dec 3, 2016*; 7:00 pm		at UNC Greensboro	L 65–72	4–4	18 – Homesley	10 – Homesley	6 – Homesley	Greensboro Coliseum (1,552); Greensboro, NC
Dec 6, 2016*; 7:00 pm		Furman	L 58–61	4–5	18 – Kemrite	5 – Kemrite	2 – Dawson	Vines Center (1,541); Lynchburg, VA
Dec 10, 2016*; 2:00 pm		Princeton	L 64–67	4–6	16 – Kemrite	8 – Homesley	4 – Homesley	Vines Center (2,510); Lynchburg, VA
Dec 16, 2016*; 7:00 pm		Clarks Summit	W 81–33	5–6	18 – Gardner	11 – Baxter-Bell	5 – Baxter-Bell	Vines Center (1,236); Lynchburg, VA
Dec 19, 2016*; 8:00 pm, ESPN3		at Lamar	L 65–82	5–7	15 – Kemrite	6 – Dawson	4 – Dawson	Montagne Center (1,677); Beaumont, TX
Dec 21, 2016*; 8:00 pm		at Houston	L 54–77	5–8	15 – Kemrite	7 – Cabbil	4 – Pacheco-Ortiz	Hofheinz Pavilion (3,540); Houston, TX
Big South regular season
December 29, 2016; 7:00 pm		at Presbyterian	W 77–61	6–8 (1–0)	16 – Kemrite	4 – Tied	4 – Tied	Templeton Physical Education Center (475); Clinton, SC
Dec 31, 2016; 2:00 pm		at Charleston Southern	W 81–70	7–8 (2–0)	19 – Kemrite	5 – Tied	5 – Pacheco-Ortiz	CSU Field House (367); North Charleston, SC
Jan 3, 2017; 7:00 pm		UNC Asheville	L 57–70	7–9 (2–1)	17 – Kemrite	6 – Dawson	2 – 3 tied	Vines Center (1,219); Lynchburg, VA
Jan 7, 2017; 2:00 pm		Campbell	W 61–54	8–9 (3–1)	21 – Cabbil	6 – Kemrite	3 – Reid	Vines Center (775); Lynchburg, VA
Jan 11, 2017; 7:00 pm		at High Point	W 62–58	9–9 (4–1)	11 – Tied	7 – Dawson	4 – Pacheco-Ortiz	Millis Athletic Convocation Center (904); High Point, NC
Jan 14, 2017; 4:30 pm		at Radford	W 71–64 ^{OT}	10–9 (5–1)	16 – Cabbil	8 – Baxter-Bell	2 – 4 tied	Dedmon Center (1,425); Radford, VA
Jan 19, 2017; 7:00 pm		Gardner–Webb	W 65–62	11–9 (6–1)	20 – Tied	6 – Gardner	5 – Pacheco-Ortiz	Vines Center (1,974); Lynchburg, VA
Jan 21, 2017; 7:00 pm		Winthrop	L 48–61	11–10 (6–2)	15 – Kemrite	12 – Dawson	3 – Cabbil	Vines Center (4,158); Lynchburg, VA
Jan 26, 2017; 7:00 pm		at Longwood	W 93–62	12–10 (7–2)	22 – Kemrite	6 – Gardner	3 – 3 tied	Willett Hall (1,614); Farmville, VA
Jan 28, 2017; 2:00 pm		at Campbell	W 72–40	13–10 (8–2)	16 – Cabbil	6 – Cabbil	6 – Dawson	John W. Pope Jr. Convocation Center (2,413); Buies Creek, NC
Jan 31, 2017; 7:00 pm		Presbyterian	W 71–51	14–10 (9–2)	19 – Baxter-Bell	3 – 3 tied	6 – Pacheco-Ortiz	Vines Center (1,718); Lynchburg, VA
Feb 4, 2017; 7:00 pm		Radford	W 57–54	15–10 (10–2)	15 – Pacheco-Ortiz	6 – Pacheco-Ortiz	3 – Tied	Vines Center (3,022); Lynchburg, VA
Feb 9, 2017; 7:00 pm		at Gardner–Webb	W 92–87 ^{2OT}	16–10 (11–2)	28 – Pacheco-Ortiz	6 – Kemrite	5 – Pacheco-Ortiz	Paul Porter Arena (1,204); Boiling Springs, NC
Feb 11, 2017; 2:00 pm		Charleston Southern	W 76–69	17–10 (12–2)	19 – Baxter-Bell	10 – Dawson	8 – Baxter-Bell	Vines Center (2,381); Lynchburg, VA
Feb 14, 2017; 7:00 pm		High Point	W 55–52	18–10 (13–2)	21 – Kemrite	6 – Cabbil	5 – Reid	Vines Center (1,469); Lynchburg, VA
Feb 18, 2017; 12:00 pm		at Winthrop	L 67–84	18–11 (13–3)	15 – Pacheco-Ortiz	6 – Pacheco-Ortiz	4 – Reid	Winthrop Coliseum (2,258); Rock Hill, SC
Feb 23, 2017; 7:00 pm		Longwood	W 61–45	19–11 (14–3)	13 – Pacheco-Ortiz	6 – Cabbil	2 – 5 tied	Vines Center (2,789); Lynchburg, VA
Feb 25, 2017; 7:00 pm		at UNC Asheville	L 45–63	19–12 (14–4)	18 – Baxter-Bell	6 – Baxter-Bell	3 – Cabbil	Kimmel Arena (2,928); Asheville, NC
Big South tournament
Feb 28, 2017; 3:00 pm, ESPN3	(3)	vs. (6) Radford; Quarterfinals	L 52–56	19–13	18 – Baxter-Bell	5 – Tied	3 – Cabbil	Winthrop Coliseum (729); Rock Hill, SC
CIT
Mar 13, 2017*; 7:00 pm, Facebook Live		Norfolk State; First Round; Coach John McLendon Classic	W 73–64	20–13	30 – Kemrite	4 – Dawson	8 – Dawson	Vines Center (574); Lynchburg, VA
Mar 20, 2017*; 7:00 pm, Facebook Live		Samford; Second Round	W 66–58	21–13	15 – Dawson	6 – Pacheco-Ortiz	6 – Pacheco-Ortiz	Vines Center (1,388); Lynchburg, VA
Mar 26, 2017*; 2:00 pm, Facebook Live		at UMBC; Quarterfinals	L 68–80	21–14	23 – Pacheco-Ortiz	5 – Pacheco-Ortiz	3 – Pacheco-Ortiz	Retriever Activities Center (869); Catonsville, MD
*Non-conference game. ^{#}Rankings from AP Poll. (#) Tournament seedings in parentheses. All times are in Eastern Time..
