= 2016–17 Winthrop Eagles men's basketball team =

American college basketball season

2016–17 Winthrop Eagles men's basketball
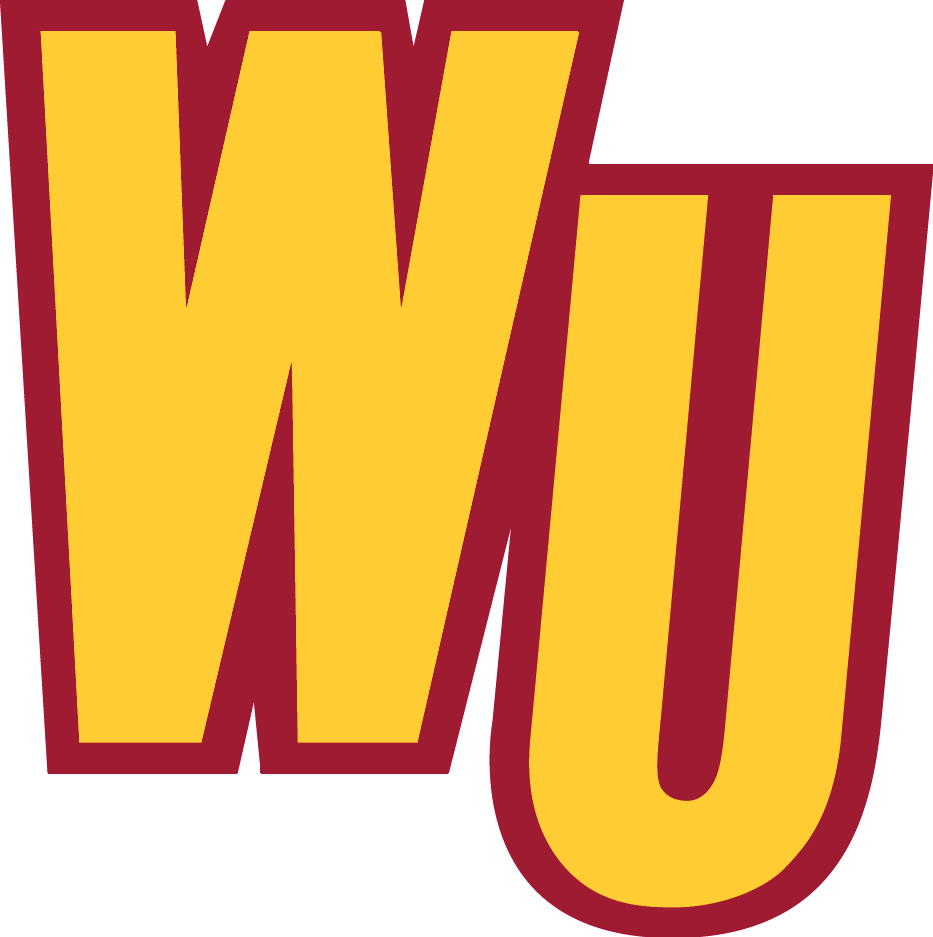

Big South regular season co–champions Big South tournament champions

NCAA tournament, First Round
- Conference: Big South Conference
- Record: 26–7 (15–3 Big South)
- Head coach: Pat Kelsey (5th season)
- Assistant coaches: Mark Prosser; Marty McGillan; Brian Kloman
- Home arena: Winthrop Coliseum

2016–17 Big South men's basketball standings
	Conf.				Overall
Team	W		L	PCT	W		L	PCT
Winthrop †	15	–	3	.833	26	–	7	.788
UNC Asheville	15	–	3	.833	23	–	10	.697
Liberty	14	–	4	.778	21	–	14	.600
Gardner–Webb	11	–	7	.611	19	–	14	.576
High Point	9	–	9	.500	15	–	16	.484
Radford	8	–	10	.444	14	–	18	.438
Campbell	7	–	11	.389	19	–	18	.514
Charleston Southern	7	–	11	.389	12	–	19	.387
Longwood	3	–	15	.167	6	–	24	.200
Presbyterian	1	–	17	.056	5	–	25	.167
† 2017 Big South tournament winner

The 2016–17 Winthrop Eagles men's basketball team represented Winthrop University during the 2016–17 NCAA Division I men's basketball season. The Eagles, led by fifth-year head coach Pat Kelsey, played their home games at the Winthrop Coliseum in Rock Hill, South Carolina as members of the Big South Conference. They finished the season 26–7, 15–3 in Big South play to finish in a tie for the regular season Big South championship. As the No. 1 seed in the Big South tournament, they defeated Charleston Southern, Gardner–Webb, and Campbell to win the tournament championship. As a result, they received the conference's automatic bid to the NCAA tournament, their first bid since 2010. In the NCAA Tournament, they lost in the first round to Butler.

After the season, head coach Pat Kelsey initially left Winthrop on March 21, 2017 to take the head coaching job at UMass, but backed out 2 days later for personal reasons and returned to the program.

== Previous season ==
The Eagles finished the 2015–16 season 23–9, 13–5 in Big South play to win a share of the regular season conference championship. They defeated Presbyterian and Gardner–Webb to advance to the championship game of the Big South tournament where they lost to UNC Asheville. Despite the regular season conference title and 23 wins, they did not participate in a postseason tournament.

== Roster ==
2016–17 Winthrop Eagles men's basketball team
Players
Coaches

Pos.	#	Name	Height	Weight	Year	Hometown
C	0	Duby Okeke	6 ft 8 in (2.03 m)	230 lb (104 kg)	RS Jr	Jonesboro, Georgia
F	1	Roderick Perkins	6 ft 5 in (1.96 m)	185 lb (84 kg)	RS Sr	Smyrna, Georgia
G	3	Kellen Blake	6 ft 2 in (1.88 m)	165 lb (75 kg)	Jr	Arlington, Virginia
SF	4	Mitch Hill	6 ft 4 in (1.93 m)	200 lb (91 kg)	Jr	Cincinnati, Ohio
G	5	Keon Johnson	5 ft 7 in (1.7 m)	160 lb (73 kg)	Sr	Mansfield, Ohio
G	10	Anders Broman	6 ft 2 in (1.88 m)	190 lb (86 kg)	RS Jr	Duluth, Minnesota
G/F	12	Xavier Cooks	6 ft 8 in (2.03 m)	185 lb (84 kg)	Jr	Wollongong, New South Wales, Australia
G	13	Bjorn Broman	6 ft 0 in (1.83 m)	177 lb (80 kg)	So	Duluth, Minnesota
G	14	Adam Pickett	6 ft 1 in (1.85 m)	195 lb (88 kg)	So	Staunton, Virginia
G	15	Patrick Fisher	6 ft 4 in (1.93 m)	200 lb (91 kg)	Fr	Carlsbad, California
F	25	Josh Ferguson	6 ft 8 in (2.03 m)	200 lb (91 kg)	Fr	Miami, Florida
F	30	Raivis Scerbinskis	6 ft 8 in (2.03 m)	215 lb (98 kg)	Fr	Riga, Latvia
F	31	Tevin Prescott	6 ft 5 in (1.96 m)	180 lb (82 kg)	RS Sr	Hartsville, South Carolina
PF	32	Freddy Poole	6 ft 7 in (2.01 m)	240 lb (109 kg)	Jr	Columbia, South Carolina
G	33	Hunter Sadlon	6 ft 0 in (1.83 m)	168 lb (76 kg)	Sr	Cincinnati, Ohio
F	42	Joshua Davenport	6 ft 5 in (1.96 m)	200 lb (91 kg)	Sr	Cincinnati, Ohio

Head coach

- Pat Kelsey (Xavier)

Assistant coach(es)

- Mark Prosser (Marist)
- Marty McGillan (UNC Wilmington)
- Brian Kloman (Tennessee)

Legend

- (C) Team captain
- (S) Suspended
- (I) Ineligible
- (W) Walk-on
- Injured
- Current redshirt

Roster

== Schedule and results ==
Date time, TV	Rank^{#}	Opponent^{#}	Result	Record	Site (attendance) city, state
Regular season
11/12/2016*; 4:00 pm		Ferrum; Homecoming	W 66–47	1–0	Winthrop Coliseum (2,501); Rock Hill, SC
11/15/2016*; 8:45 am, ESPN2		at Manhattan; NIT Season Tip-Off	W 94–81	2–0	Draddy Gymnasium (1,051); Riverdale, NY
11/18/2016*; 7:00 pm, ACCN Extra		at Florida State; NIT Season Tip-Off	L 86–100	2–1	Donald L. Tucker Center (5,197); Tallahassee, FL
11/21/2016*; 8:00 pm, ESPN3		at Illinois; NIT Season Tip-Off	W 84–80 ^{OT}	3–1	State Farm Center (9,502); Champaign, IL
11/27/2016*; 2:00 pm		New Hampshire; NIT Season Tip-Off	L 60–65	3–2	Winthrop Coliseum (922); Rock Hill, SC
11/30/2016*; 6:30 pm		Furman	W 58–57	4–2	Winthrop Coliseum (1,441); Rock Hill, SC
12/03/2016*; 2:00 pm		at Dayton	L 67–83	4–3	UD Arena (12,708); Dayton, OH
12/06/2016*; 6:30 pm		Greensboro College	W 106–63	5–3	Winthrop Coliseum (916); Rock Hill, SC
12/17/2016*; 2:00 pm		at Hampton	W 86–79	6–3	Hampton Convocation Center (6,426); Hampton, VA
12/20/2016*; 11:30 am		Georgia Southern	W 86–84	7–3	Winthrop Coliseum (2,534); Rock Hill, SC
12/22/2016*; 8:00 pm, FSMW+		at Saint Louis	W 66–55	8–3	Chaifetz Arena (5,345); St. Louis, MO
12/29/2016; 7:30 pm		at Charleston Southern	W 84–68	9–3 (1–0)	CSU Field House (665); North Charleston, SC
12/31/2016; 12:00 pm		Radford	L 80–82	9–4 (1–1)	Winthrop Coliseum (1,199); Rock Hill, SC
01/04/2017; 7:00 pm		at High Point	W 80–74	10–4 (2–1)	Millis Athletic Center (1,127); High Point, NC
01/07/2017; 4:00 pm		Longwood	W 83–65	11–4 (3–1)	Winthrop Coliseum (1,155); Rock Hill, SC
01/11/2017; 6:30 pm		Presbyterian	W 75–52	12–4 (4–1)	Winthrop Coliseum (1,257); Rock Hill, SC
01/14/2017; 6:30 pm		at Campbell	W 72–63	13–4 (5–1)	Gore Arena (2,283); Buies Creek, NC
01/19/2017; 6:30 pm		UNC Asheville	W 76–73	14–4 (6–1)	Winthrop Coliseum (3,215); Rock Hill, SC
01/21/2017; 7:00 pm		at Liberty	W 61–48	15–4 (7–1)	Vines Center (4,158); Lynchburg, VA
01/23/2017*; 6:30 pm		Pfeiffer; Canceled (mutual agreement between schools)			Winthrop Coliseum; Rock Hill, SC
01/26/2017; 7:00 pm		at Gardner–Webb	W 72–70	16–4 (8–1)	Paul Porter Arena (1,781); Boiling Springs, NC
01/28/2017; 2:00 pm		High Point	L 80–83 ^{OT}	16–5 (8–2)	Winthrop Coliseum (2,255); Rock Hill, SC
02/01/2017; 7:00 pm		at Radford	W 81–65	17–5 (9–2)	Dedmon Center (1,131); Radford, VA
02/04/2017; 2:00 pm		Campbell	W 76–62	18–5 (10–2)	Winthrop Coliseum (2,481); Rock Hill, SC
02/09/2017; 7:00 pm		at UNC Asheville	L 101–104 ^{2OT}	18–6 (10–3)	Kimmel Arena (2,732); Asheville, NC
02/11/2017; 2:00 pm		Gardner–Webb	W 77–71	19–6 (11–3)	Winthrop Coliseum (1,567); Rock Hill, SC
02/15/2017; 7:00 pm		at Longwood	W 83–63	20–6 (12–3)	Willett Hall (1,011); Farmville, VA
02/18/2017; 2:00 pm		Liberty	W 84–67	21–6 (13–3)	Winthrop Coliseum (2,258); Rock Hill, SC
02/23/2017; 6:30 pm		Charleston Southern	W 86–72	22–6 (14–3)	Winthrop Coliseum (1,969); Rock Hill, SC
02/25/2017; 4:30 pm		at Presbyterian	W 93–56	23–6 (15–3)	Templeton Center (431); Clinton, SC
Big South tournament
03/02/2017; 7:00 pm, ESPN3	(1)	(8) Charleston Southern; Quarterfinals	W 92–78	24–6	Winthrop Coliseum (2,556); Rock Hill, SC
03/03/2017; 8:00 pm, ESPN3	(1)	(4) Gardner–Webb; Semifinals	W 80–77 ^{OT}	25–6	Winthrop Coliseum (3,008); Rock Hill, SC
03/05/2017; 1:00 pm, ESPN	(1)	(7) Campbell; Championship	W 76–59	26–6	Winthrop Coliseum (5,109); Rock Hill, SC
NCAA tournament
Mar 16, 2017*; 1:30 pm, TNT	(13 S)	vs. (4 S) No. 21 Butler; First Round	L 64–76	26–7	BMO Harris Bradley Center (18,025); Milwaukee, WI
*Non-conference game. ^{#}Rankings from AP Poll. (#) Tournament seedings in parentheses. S=South Region Source. All times are in Eastern Time.
