= 2016–17 UNC Asheville Bulldogs men's basketball team =

American college basketball season

2016–17 UNC Asheville Bulldogs men's basketball
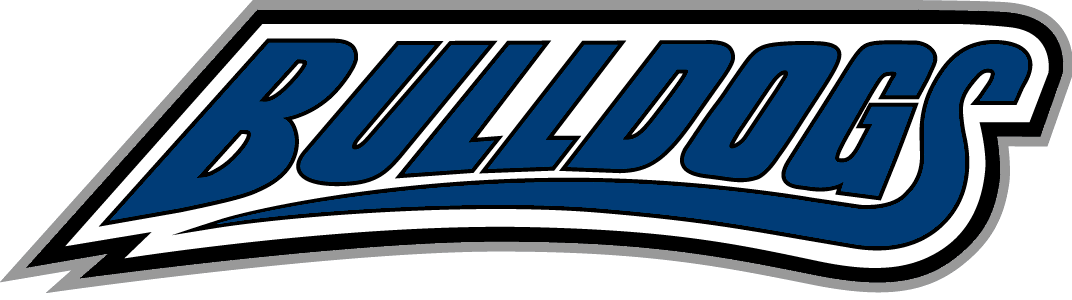

Big South regular-season co-champions

CIT, first round
- Conference: Big South Conference
- Record: 23–10 (15–3 Big South)
- Head coach: Nick McDevitt (4th season)
- Assistant coaches: Brett Carey; Sean Dixon; Logan Johnson
- Home arena: Kimmel Arena

2016–17 Big South men's basketball standings
	Conf.				Overall
Team	W		L	PCT	W		L	PCT
Winthrop †	15	–	3	.833	26	–	7	.788
UNC Asheville	15	–	3	.833	23	–	10	.697
Liberty	14	–	4	.778	21	–	14	.600
Gardner–Webb	11	–	7	.611	19	–	14	.576
High Point	9	–	9	.500	15	–	16	.484
Radford	8	–	10	.444	14	–	18	.438
Campbell	7	–	11	.389	19	–	18	.514
Charleston Southern	7	–	11	.389	12	–	19	.387
Longwood	3	–	15	.167	6	–	24	.200
Presbyterian	1	–	17	.056	5	–	25	.167
† 2017 Big South tournament winner

The 2016–17 UNC Asheville Bulldogs men's basketball team represented the University of North Carolina at Asheville during the 2016–17 NCAA Division I men's basketball season. The Bulldogs, led by fourth-year head coach Nick McDevitt, played their home games at Kimmel Arena in Asheville, North Carolina as members of the Big South Conference. They finished the season 23–10, 15–3 in Big South play, to finish in a tie for the Big South regular-season championship. They were upset in the quarterfinals of the Big South tournament by Campbell. They were invited to the CollegeInsider.com Tournament where they lost in the first round to UT Martin.

== Previous season ==
The Bulldogs finished the 2015–16 season 22–12, 12–6 in Big South play, to finish in a tie for third place. They defeated Liberty, High Point and Winthrop to become champions of the Big South tournament. They received the conference's automatic bid to the NCAA tournament where they were lost in the first round to the eventual national champion Villanova.

== Roster ==
2016–17 UNC Asheville Bulldogs men's basketball team
Players
Coaches

Pos.	#	Name	Height	Weight	Year	Hometown
F	0	Donovan Gilmore	6 ft 7 in (2.01 m)	200 lb (91 kg)	So	Greensboro, NC
F	2	Alec Wnuk	6 ft 7 in (2.01 m)	205 lb (93 kg)	Jr	Cary, NC
F	3	Asante Monadjemi	6 ft 6 in (1.98 m)	190 lb (86 kg)	Jr	Durham, NC
G	5	Justin Brown	6 ft 2 in (1.88 m)	200 lb (91 kg)	Fr	Miami, FL
G	10	Kevin Vannatta	6 ft 2 in (1.88 m)	200 lb (91 kg)	Jr	Upper Arlington, OH
F	11	Jonathan Baehre	6 ft 9 in (2.06 m)	195 lb (88 kg)	Fr	Hessen, Germany
G	12	Raekwon Miller	6 ft 3 in (1.91 m)	175 lb (79 kg)	Jr	Marion, NC
G	13	David Robertson	6 ft 3 in (1.91 m)	195 lb (88 kg)	Sr	Cary, NC
G	14	Ahmad Thomas	6 ft 3 in (1.91 m)	215 lb (98 kg)	Jr	Danville, VA
F	15	Grant Townsend	6 ft 7 in (2.01 m)	215 lb (98 kg)	Fr	Valrico, FL
F	21	Giacomo Zilli	6 ft 8 in (2.03 m)	255 lb (116 kg)	Sr	Udine, Italy
F	22	Malik Smith	6 ft 6 in (1.98 m)	215 lb (98 kg)	Fr	Cleveland, OH
G	31	MaCio Teague	6 ft 3 in (1.91 m)	185 lb (84 kg)	Fr	Cleveland, OH
F	32	Will Weeks	6 ft 6 in (1.98 m)	220 lb (100 kg)	RS Sr	Charlotte, NC
G	33	Drew Rackley	6 ft 1 in (1.85 m)	185 lb (84 kg)	Fr	New Concord, OH

Head coach

- Nick McDevitt (UNC Asheville)

Assistant coach(es)

- Brett Carey (UNC Asheville)
- Sean Dixon (Presbyterian)
- Logan Johnson (Coastal Carolina)

Legend

- (C) Team captain
- (S) Suspended
- (I) Ineligible
- (W) Walk-on
- Injured
- Current redshirt

Roster
Last update: March 17, 2025

== Schedule and results ==
Date time, TV	Rank^{#}	Opponent^{#}	Result	Record	Site (attendance) city, state
Exhibition
November 5, 2016*; 7:00 p.m.		Montreat	W 101–59		Kimmel Arena (841); Asheville, NC
Non-conference regular season
November 11, 2016*; 7:00 p.m., WTVR-TV		at VCU	W 80–65	0–1	Siegel Center (7,637); Richmond, VA
November 14, 2016*; 7:00 p.m.		at Georgia; CBE Hall of Fame Classic	W 60–46	0–2	Stegeman Coliseum (6,415); Athens, GA
November 17, 2016*; 7:00 p.m.		at USC Upstate	W 73–57	1–2	Hodge Center (537); Spartanburg, SC
November 20, 2016*; 2:00 p.m.		Siena; CBE Hall of Fame Classic	W 92–80	2–2	Kimmel Arena (1,227); Asheville, NC
November 22, 2016*; 7:00 p.m.		at Furman; CBE Hall of Fame Classic	W 64–58	3–2	Timmons Arena (1,216); Greenville, SC
November 25, 2016*; 7:00 p.m., ESPN3		at No. 5 Kansas; CBE Hall of Fame Classic	L 57–95	3–3	Allen Fieldhouse (16,300); Lawrence, KS
November 29, 2016*; 7:00 p.m.		Brevard	W 68–50	4–3	Kimmel Arena (939); Asheville, NC
December 3, 2016*; 2:00 p.m.		at Coastal Carolina	W 79–77 ^{OT}	5–3	HTC Center (1,447); Conway, SC
December 6, 2016*; 7:00 p.m.		at Elon	W 78–67	6–3	Alumni Gym (1,421); Elon, NC
December 10, 2016*; 7:00 p.m.		Warren Wilson	W 117–52	7–3	Kimmel Arena (1,229); Asheville, NC
December 17, 2016*; 4:30 p.m.		Western Carolina	W 59–57	8–3	Kimmel Arena (1,661); Asheville, NC
December 19, 2016*; 7:00 p.m.		UNC Greensboro	L 73–75	8–4	Kimmel Arena (1,269); Asheville, NC
December 22, 2016*; 9:00 p.m., ESPN2		at Ohio State	L 77–79	8–5	Value City Arena; Columbus, OH
Big South Conference regular season
December 29, 2016; 7:00 p.m.		at Radford	L 77–80 ^{OT}	8–6 (0–1)	Dedmon Center (807); Radford, VA
December 31, 2016; 2:00 p.m.		Gardner–Webb	W 90–85 ^{OT}	9–6 (1–1)	Kimmel Arena (1,491); Asheville, NC
January 3, 2017; 7:00 p.m.		at Liberty	W 70–57	10–6 (2–1)	Vines Center (1,219); Lynchburg, VA
January 7, 2017; 2:00 p.m.		High Point	W 88–58	11–6 (3–1)	Kimmel Arena (912); Asheville, NC
January 11, 2017; 7:00 p.m.		Longwood	W 89–68	12–6 (4–1)	Kimmel Arena (1,262); Asheville, NC
January 14, 2017; 5:30 p.m.		at Charleston Southern	W 76–67	13–6 (5–1)	CSU Field House (755); North Charleston, SC
January 19, 2017; 6:30 p.m.		at Winthrop	L 73–76	13–7 (5–2)	Winthrop Coliseum (3,215); Rock Hill, SC
January 21, 2017; 4:30 p.m.		Campbell	W 72–56	14–7 (6–2)	Kimmel Arena; Asheville, NC
January 26, 2017; 7:00 p.m.		at Presbyterian	W 73–47	15–7 (7–2)	Templeton Center (602); Clinton, SC
January 28, 2017; 12:00 p.m.		Radford	W 80–69	16–7 (8–2)	Kimmel Arena (1,744); Asheville, NC
February 1, 2017; 7:00 p.m.		Charleston Southern	W 91–73	17–7 (9–2)	Kimmel Arena (1,333); Asheville, NC
February 4, 2017; 7:00 p.m.		at High Point	W 74–71	18–7 (10–2)	Millis Athletic Center (1,750); High Point, NC
February 9, 2017; 7:00 p.m., ESPNU		Winthrop	W 104–101 ^{2OT}	19–7 (11–2)	Kimmel Arena (2,732); Asheville, NC
February 11, 2017; 5:00 p.m.		at Longwood	W 91–69	20–7 (12–2)	Willett Hall (1,312); Farmville, VA
February 15, 2017; 7:00 p.m.		Presbyterian	W 89–48	21–7 (13–2)	Kimmel Arena (1,523); Asheville, NC
February 18, 2017; 2:00 p.m.		at Campbell	W 66–53	22–7 (14–2)	Gore Arena (1,584); Buies Creek, NC
February 23, 2017; 7:00 p.m., ESPNU		at Gardner–Webb	L 76–81	22–8 (14–3)	Paul Porter Arena (2,289); Boiling Springs, NC
February 25, 2017; 12:00 p.m.		Liberty	W 63–45	23–8 (15–3)	Kimmel Arena (2,928); Asheville, NC
Big South tournament
March 2, 2017; 1:00 p.m., ESPN3	(2)	vs. (7) Campbell; Quarterfinals	L 79–81	23–9	Winthrop Coliseum (729); Rock Hill, SC
CIT
March 16, 2017*; 8:00 p.m., Facebook Live		at UT Martin; First round	L 75–89	23–10	Skyhawk Arena (504); Martin, TN
*Non-conference game. ^{#}Rankings from AP poll. (#) Tournament seedings in parentheses. All times are in Eastern.
