= 2016–17 High Point Panthers men's basketball team =

American college basketball season

2016–17 High Point Panthers men's basketball
- Conference: Big South Conference
- Record: 15–16 (9–9 Big South)
- Head coach: Scott Cherry (8th season)
- Assistant coaches: Ahmad Dorsett; Trey Brown; Eric Grabriel
- Home arena: Millis Athletic Center

2016–17 Big South men's basketball standings
	Conf.				Overall
Team	W		L	PCT	W		L	PCT
Winthrop †	15	–	3	.833	26	–	7	.788
UNC Asheville	15	–	3	.833	23	–	10	.697
Liberty	14	–	4	.778	21	–	14	.600
Gardner–Webb	11	–	7	.611	19	–	14	.576
High Point	9	–	9	.500	15	–	16	.484
Radford	8	–	10	.444	14	–	18	.438
Campbell	7	–	11	.389	19	–	18	.514
Charleston Southern	7	–	11	.389	12	–	19	.387
Longwood	3	–	15	.167	6	–	24	.200
Presbyterian	1	–	17	.056	5	–	25	.167
† 2017 Big South tournament winner

The 2016–17 High Point Panthers men's basketball team represented High Point University during the 2016–17 NCAA Division I men's basketball season. The Panthers, led by eighth-year head coach Scott Cherry, played their home games at the Millis Athletic Convocation Center as members of the Big South Conference. They finished the season 15–16, 9–9 in Big South play, to finish in fifth place. They lost in the quarterfinals of the Big South tournament to Gardner–Webb.

== Previous season ==
The Panthers finished the 2015–16 season 21–11, 13–5 in Big South play, to win a share of the regular season championship. They defeated Longwood in the quarterfinals of the Big South tournament before losing to UNC Asheville in the semifinals. As a regular season conference champion and No. 1 seed in their conference tournament who did not with their conference tournament, they received an automatic bid to the National Invitation Tournament where they lost in the first round to South Carolina.

== Roster ==
2016–17 High Point Panthers men's basketball team
Players
Coaches

Pos.	#	Name	Height	Weight	Year	Hometown
G	1	Brandonn Kamga	6 ft 5 in (1.96 m)	217 lb (98 kg)	RS Fr	Reston, VA
G	2	Austin White	6 ft 0 in (1.83 m)	190 lb (86 kg)	Jr	South Orange, NJ
G	3	Jamal Wright	5 ft 11 in (1.8 m)	175 lb (79 kg)	Fr	Upper Marlboro, MD
G	4	Jalen Williams	6 ft 2 in (1.88 m)	170 lb (77 kg)	Jr	Clinton, MD
F	10	Tarique Thompson	6 ft 5 in (1.96 m)	215 lb (98 kg)	Sr	Raeford, NC
G	13	Jahaad Proctor	6 ft 3 in (1.91 m)	205 lb (93 kg)	RS Fr	Harrisburg, PA
F	14	Luke Vargo	6 ft 7 in (2.01 m)	205 lb (93 kg)	Fr	Dublin, OH
F	15	Cliff Jr. Thomas	6 ft 8 in (2.03 m)	215 lb (98 kg)	Fr	Montgomery, AL
G	22	Andre Fox	6 ft 4 in (1.93 m)	185 lb (84 kg)	So	Greenbelt, MD
G	24	Anthony Lindauer	6 ft 3 in (1.91 m)	195 lb (88 kg)	Sr	Moline, IL
G/F	25	Ricky Madison	6 ft 7 in (2.01 m)	215 lb (98 kg)	So	Norcross, GA
C	30	Sam Berlin	6 ft 10 in (2.08 m)	250 lb (113 kg)	RS So	Manassas, VA
F	33	Miles Jr. Bowman	6 ft 6 in (1.98 m)	220 lb (100 kg)	RS Sr	Winston-Salem, NC
F	34	Jordan Whitehead	6 ft 5 in (1.96 m)	235 lb (107 kg)	Jr	Morris Plains, NJ
G	35	Dexter Gooding	6 ft 4 in (1.93 m)	180 lb (82 kg)	So	Daytona Beach, FL

Head coach

- Scott Cherry (North Carolina)

Assistant coach(es)

- Ahmad Dorsett (George Mason)
- Trey Brown (South Carolina)
- Eric Gabriel (West Liberty)

Legend

- (C) Team captain
- (S) Suspended
- (I) Ineligible
- (W) Walk-on
- Injured
- Current redshirt

Roster
Last update: July 24, 2024

== Schedule and results ==
Date time, TV	Rank^{#}	Opponent^{#}	Result	Record	Site (attendance) city, state
Non-conference regular season
November 12, 2016*; 7:00 p.m.		Averett	W 74–41	1–0	Millis Center (1,333); High Point, NC
November 15, 2016*; 7:00 p.m., ACCN Extra		at Virginia Tech	L 73–99	1–1	Cassell Coliseum (6,428); Blacksburg, VA
November 18, 2016*; 7:00 p.m.		UNC Greensboro; HPU Classic	W 63–57	2–1	Millis Center (1,750); High Point, NC
November 19, 2016*; 4:00 p.m.		Navy; HPU Classic	W 69–62	3–1	Millis Center (1,750); High Point, NC
November 20, 2016*; 12:30 p.m.		North Dakota State	L 44–70	3–2	Millis Center (1,100); High Point, NC
November 25, 2016*; 7:00 p.m., ACCN Extra		at Clemson	L 74–83	3–3	Littlejohn Coliseum (5,500); Clemson, SC
November 28, 2016*; 7:00 p.m.		at Morgan State	W 62–61	4–3	Talmadge L. Hill Field House (892); Baltimore, MD
December 3, 2016*; 7:00 p.m.		Drexel	L 72–78	4–4	Millis Center (1,106); High Point, NC
December 6, 2016*; 8:00 p.m., SECN		at Vanderbilt	L 63–90	4–5	Memorial Gymnasium (8,288); Nashville, TN
December 11, 2016*; 2:00 p.m.		Ferrum	W 77–53	5–5	Millis Center (805); High Point, NC
December 16, 2016*; 7:00 p.m.		North Carolina Wesleyan	W 79–61	6–5	Millis Center (1,115); High Point, NC
December 19, 2016*; 7:30 p.m.		at Western Carolina	L 65–70	6–6	Ramsey Center; Cullowhee, NC
Big South regular season
December 29, 2016; 7:00 p.m.		at Gardner–Webb	W 71–64	7–6 (1–0)	Paul Porter Arena (1,014); Boiling Springs, NC
December 31, 2016; 4:00 p.m.		Longwood	L 55–60	7–7 (1–1)	Millis Cener (712); High Point, NC
January 4, 2017; 7:00 p.m.		Winthrop	L 74–80	7–8 (1–2)	Millis Center (1,127); High Point, NC
January 7, 2017; 2:00 p.m.		at UNC Asheville	L 58–88	7–9 (1–3)	Kimmel Arena (912); Asheville, NC
January 11, 2017; 7:00 p.m.		Liberty	L 58–62	7–10 (1–4)	Millis Center (904); High Point, NC
January 14, 2017; 7:00 p.m.		Presbyterian	W 77–44	8–10 (2–4)	Millis Center (1,404); High Point, NC
January 19, 2017; 7:00 p.m.		at Campbell	W 83–78	9–10 (3–4)	Gore Arena (2,180); Buies Creek, NC
January 21, 2017; 12:00 p.m., ASN		at Radford	W 61–58	10–10 (4–4)	Dedmon Center (1,511); Radford, VA
January 26, 2017; 7:00 p.m.		Charleston Southern	W 72–69 ^{OT}	11–10 (5–4)	Millis Center (1,137); High Point, NC
January 28, 2017; 2:00 p.m., ESPN3		at Winthrop	W 83–80 ^{OT}	12–10 (6–4)	Winthrop Coliseum (2,255); Rock Hill, SC
February 1, 2017; 7:00 p.m.		at Longwood	W 92–68	13–10 (7–4)	Willett Hall (842); Farmville, VA
February 4, 2017; 7:00 p.m., ESPN3		UNC Asheville	L 71–74	13–11 (7–5)	Millis Center (1,750); High Point, NC
February 9, 2017; 7:00 p.m.		at Presbyterian	W 68–58	14–11 (8–5)	Templeton Center (379); Clinton, SC
February 11, 2017; 7:00 p.m.		Radford	L 68–69 ^{OT}	14–12 (8–6)	Millis Center (1,141); High Point, NC
February 14, 2017; 7:00 p.m.		at Liberty	L 52–55	14–13 (8–7)	Vines Center (1,469); Lynchburg, VA
February 18, 2017; 5:30 p.m.		at Charleston Southern	L 75–76	14–14 (8–8)	CSU Field House (802); North Charleston, SC
February 23, 2017; 7:00 p.m.		Campbell	W 59–49	15–14 (9–8)	Millis Center (1,404); High Point, NC
February 25, 2017; 4:00 p.m.		Gardner–Webb	L 86–88 ^{OT}	15–15 (9–9)	Millis Center (1,174); High Point, NC
Big South tournament
March 2, 2017; 9:00 p.m., ESPN3	(5)	vs. (4) Gardner–Webb; Quarterfinals	L 55–91	15–16	Winthrop Coliseum (2,556); Rock Hill, SC
*Non-conference game. (#) Tournament seedings in parentheses. All times are in Eastern.
