= 2016–17 Presbyterian Blue Hose men's basketball team =

American college basketball season

2016–17 Presbyterian Blue Hose men's basketball
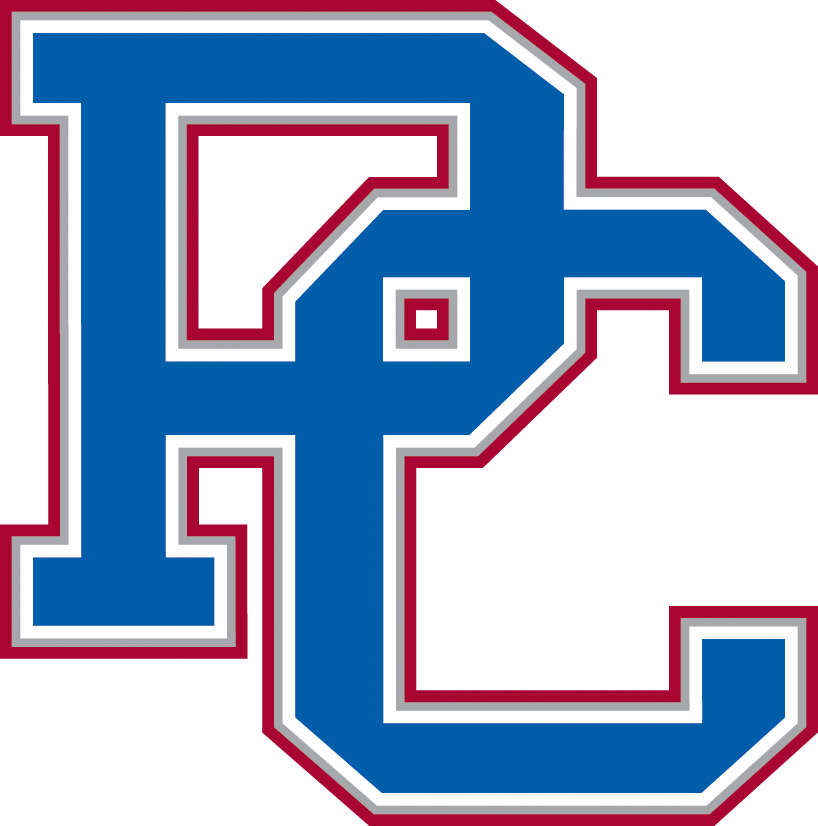
- Conference: Big South Conference
- Record: 5–25 (1–17 Big South)
- Head coach: Gregg Nibert (28th season)
- Assistant coach: Cassius Bosket; John Reynolds; Bill Morosco
- Home arena: Templeton Physical Education Center

2016–17 Big South men's basketball standings
	Conf.				Overall
Team	W		L	PCT	W		L	PCT
Winthrop †	15	–	3	.833	26	–	7	.788
UNC Asheville	15	–	3	.833	23	–	10	.697
Liberty	14	–	4	.778	21	–	14	.600
Gardner–Webb	11	–	7	.611	19	–	14	.576
High Point	9	–	9	.500	15	–	16	.484
Radford	8	–	10	.444	14	–	18	.438
Campbell	7	–	11	.389	19	–	18	.514
Charleston Southern	7	–	11	.389	12	–	19	.387
Longwood	3	–	15	.167	6	–	24	.200
Presbyterian	1	–	17	.056	5	–	25	.167
† 2017 Big South tournament winner

The 2016–17 Presbyterian Blue Hose men's basketball team represented Presbyterian College during the 2016–17 NCAA Division I men's basketball season. The Blue Hose, led by 28th-year head coach Gregg Nibert, played their home games at the Templeton Physical Education Center in Clinton, South Carolina as members of the Big South Conference. They finished the season 5–25, 1–17 in Big South play to finish in last place. They lost in the first round of the Big South tournament to Campbell.

Head coach Gregg Nibert resigned on April 12, 2017 after 28 seasons at Presbyterian, and was replaced by Wofford assistant Dustin Kerns on May 22.

== Previous season ==
The Blue Hose finished the 2015–16 season 11–20, 5–13 in Big South play to finish a four-way tie for eighth place. They defeated Radford in the first round of the Big South tournament before losing in the quarterfinals to Winthrop.

== Roster ==
2016–17 Presbyterian Blue Hose men's basketball team
Players
Coaches

Pos.	#	Name	Height	Weight	Year	Hometown
G	0	Jaron Withers	6 ft 4 in (1.93 m)	200 lb (91 kg)	Jr	Winston-Salem, North Carolina
G	1	Darius Moore	5 ft 10 in (1.78 m)	170 lb (77 kg)	So	Browns Summit, North Carolina
G	4	Myles McGregor	6 ft 3 in (1.91 m)	165 lb (75 kg)	Fr	Charlotte, North Carolina
G	5	Davon Bell	5 ft 10 in (1.78 m)	175 lb (79 kg)	Jr	Charlotte, North Carolina
C	11	Armel TeTe	6 ft 9 in (2.06 m)	210 lb (95 kg)	Fr	Fayetteville, North Carolina
C	12	Stephen Osu	6 ft 9 in (2.06 m)	255 lb (116 kg)	Jr	Herndon, Virginia
G	13	Charlie Inclan	5 ft 10 in (1.78 m)	165 lb (75 kg)	Sr	Spartanburg, South Carolina
G	14	Reggie Dillard	6 ft 4 in (1.93 m)	222 lb (101 kg)	RS Jr	Greensboro, North Carolina
G	20	Brent Carraway	5 ft 8 in (1.73 m)	150 lb (68 kg)	Fr	Sumter, South Carolina
G	21	Jo'Vontae Millner	6 ft 6 in (1.98 m)	205 lb (93 kg)	Fr	Burlington, North Carolina
F	23	Ruben Arroyo	6 ft 8 in (2.03 m)	215 lb (98 kg)	Jr	Patillas, Puerto Rico
G	24	Will Adams	5 ft 10 in (1.78 m)	180 lb (82 kg)	Sr	Johnson City, Tennessee
G	25	JC Younger	6 ft 4 in (1.93 m)	200 lb (91 kg)	Fr	Mandeville, Louisiana
G	32	Harrison Burton	6 ft 2 in (1.88 m)	185 lb (84 kg)	So	Rock Hill, South Carolina
F	34	Ed Drew	6 ft 5 in (1.96 m)	215 lb (98 kg)	Sr	Suffolk, Virginia
C	35	Austin Venable	6 ft 9 in (2.06 m)	260 lb (118 kg)	So	Homer, Georgia

Head coach

- Gregg Nibert (Marietta)

Assistant coach(es)

- John Reynolds (The Citadel)
- Cassius Bosket (Clemson)
- Bill Morosco (Florida)

Legend

- (C) Team captain
- (S) Suspended
- (I) Ineligible
- (W) Walk-on
- Injured
- Current redshirt

Roster

== Schedule and results ==
Date time, TV	Rank^{#}	Opponent^{#}	Result	Record	Site (attendance) city, state
Exhibition
11/02/2016*; 7:00 pm		Belmont Abbey	W 124–118 ^{4OT}		Templeton Center (249); Clinton, SC
Non-conference regular season
11/11/2016*; 7:00 pm		Furman	W 73–71	1–0	Templeton Center (912); Clinton, SC
11/14/2016*; 7:30 pm		at UNC Greensboro	L 42–61	1–1	Greensboro Coliseum (1,689); Greensboro, NC
11/19/2016*; 7:00 pm		at William & Mary	L 59–89	1–2	Kaplan Arena (2,315); Williamsburg, VA
11/22/2016*; 7:00 pm		VMI	W 77–67	2–2	Templeton Center (430); Clinton, SC
11/25/2016*; 9:00 pm		at Boise State	L 56–82	2–3	Taco Bell Arena (4,061); Boise, ID
11/28/2016*; 7:00 pm		at The Citadel	L 83–97	2–4	McAlister Field House (3,278); Charleston, SC
12/01/2016*; 7:00 pm		Johnson & Wales (NC)	W 107–63	3–4	Templeton Center (341); Clinton, SC
12/06/2016*; 7:00 pm		at Tennessee	L 50–90	3–5	Thompson–Boling Arena (11,547); Knoxville, TN
12/13/2016*; 7:00 pm		at USC Upstate	L 48–76	3–6	Hodge Center (572); Spartanburg, SC
12/17/2016*; 2:00 pm		Coastal Georgia	W 90–48	4–6	Templeton Center (204); Clinton, SC
12/22/2016*; 7:00 pm		at East Carolina	L 56–76	4–7	Williams Arena at Minges Coliseum (3,667); Greenville, NC
Big South regular season
12/29/2016; 7:00 pm		Liberty	L 61–77	4–8 (0–1)	Templeton Center (475); Clinton, SC
12/31/2016; 2:00 pm		at Campbell	L 58–69	4–9 (0–2)	Gore Arena (1,427); Buies Creek, NC
01/04/2017; 7:00 pm		at Longwood	L 76–79	4–10 (0–3)	Willett Hall (518); Farmville, VA
01/07/2017; 7:00 pm		Radford	L 63–76	4–11 (0–4)	Templeton Center (251); Clinton, SC
01/11/2017; 6:30 pm		at Winthrop	L 52–75	4–12 (0–5)	Winthrop Coliseum (1,257); Rock Hill, SC
01/14/2017; 7:00 pm		at High Point	L 44–77	4–13 (0–6)	Millis Athletic Center (1,404); High Point, NC
01/19/2017; 7:00 pm		Charleston Southern	L 52–73	4–14 (0–7)	Templeton Center (635); Clinton, SC
01/21/2017; 3:00 pm		at Gardner–Webb	L 58–61	4–15 (0–8)	Paul Porter Arena (1,457); Boiling Springs, NC
01/26/2017; 7:00 pm		UNC Asheville	L 47–73	4–16 (0–9)	Templeton Center (602); Clinton, SC
01/28/2017; 7:00 pm		Longwood	W 71–62	5–16 (1–9)	Templeton Center (707); Clinton, SC
01/31/2017; 7:00 pm		at Liberty	L 51–71	5–17 (1–10)	Vines Center (1,718); Lynchburg, VA
02/04/2017; 5:30 pm		at Charleston Southern	L 65–71 ^{OT}	5–18 (1–11)	CSU Field House (665); North Charleston, SC
02/09/2017; 7:00 pm		High Point	L 58–68	5–19 (1–12)	Templeton Center (379); Clinton, SC
02/11/2017; 4:30 pm		Campbell	L 57–70	5–20 (1–13)	Templeton Center (865); Clinton, SC
02/15/2017; 7:00 pm		at UNC Asheville	L 48–89	5–21 (1–14)	Kimmel Arena (1,523); Asheville, NC
02/18/2017; 7:00 pm		Gardner–Webb	L 56–84	5–22 (1–15)	Templeton Center; Clinton, SC
02/23/2017; 7:00 pm		at Radford	L 57–59	5–23 (1–16)	Dedmon Center (1,448); Radford, VA
02/25/2017; 4:30 pm		Winthrop	L 56–93	5–24 (1–17)	Templeton Center (431); Clinton, SC
Big South tournament
02/28/2017; 7:00 pm	(10)	at (7) Campbell; First round	L 62–81	5–25	Gore Arena (1,328); Buies Creek, NC
*Non-conference game. ^{#}Rankings from AP Poll. (#) Tournament seedings in parentheses. All times are in Eastern Time Source.
