= 2016–17 Gardner–Webb Runnin' Bulldogs men's basketball team =

American college basketball season

2016–17 Gardner–Webb Runnin' Bulldogs men's basketball
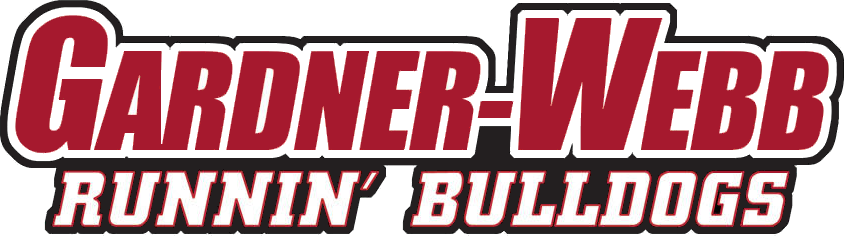
- Conference: Big South Conference
- Record: 19–14 (11–7 Big South)
- Head coach: Tim Craft (4th season)
- Assistant coaches: Jeremy Luther; Paul Hemrick; DeAntoine Beasley
- Home arena: Paul Porter Arena

2016–17 Big South men's basketball standings
	Conf.				Overall
Team	W		L	PCT	W		L	PCT
Winthrop †	15	–	3	.833	26	–	7	.788
UNC Asheville	15	–	3	.833	23	–	10	.697
Liberty	14	–	4	.778	21	–	14	.600
Gardner–Webb	11	–	7	.611	19	–	14	.576
High Point	9	–	9	.500	15	–	16	.484
Radford	8	–	10	.444	14	–	18	.438
Campbell	7	–	11	.389	19	–	18	.514
Charleston Southern	7	–	11	.389	12	–	19	.387
Longwood	3	–	15	.167	6	–	24	.200
Presbyterian	1	–	17	.056	5	–	25	.167
† 2017 Big South tournament winner

The 2016–17 Gardner–Webb Runnin' Bulldogs men's basketball team represented Gardner–Webb University during the 2016–17 NCAA Division I men's basketball season. The Runnin' Bulldogs, led by fourth-year head coach Tim Craft, played their home games at the Paul Porter Arena in Boiling Springs, North Carolina as members of the Big South Conference. They finished the regular season 18–13, 11–7 in Big South play to finish in fourth place. They received the No. 4 seed in the Big South tournament where they defeated High Point in the quarterfinals before losing in the semifinals to Winthrop.

== Previous season ==
The Runnin' Bulldogs finished the 2015–16 season 17–16, 10–8 in Big South play to finish in a tie for fifth place. They defeated Campbell and Coastal Carolina to advance to the semifinals of the Big South tournament where they lost to Winthrop.

== Roster ==
2016–17 Gardner–Webb Runnin' Bulldogs men's basketball team
Players
Coaches

Pos.	#	Name	Height	Weight	Year	Hometown
G	0	Jamaal Robateau	6 ft 5 in (1.96 m)	180 lb (82 kg)	RS Jr	Sunshine Coast, Queensland, Australia
G	1	Justin Jenkins	6 ft 2 in (1.88 m)	200 lb (91 kg)	So	Knoxville, Tennessee
G/F	2	Eric Jamison	6 ft 4 in (1.93 m)	175 lb (79 kg)	So	East Point, Georgia
G	3	Laquincy Rideau	6 ft 1 in (1.85 m)	204 lb (93 kg)	So	West Palm Beach, Florida
G	4	Christian Turner	5 ft 10 in (1.78 m)	180 lb (82 kg)	Fr	Atlanta, Georgia
G	5	Liam O'Reilly	6 ft 2 in (1.88 m)	180 lb (82 kg)	Jr	Austin, Texas
G	10	Nate Johnson	6 ft 4 in (1.93 m)	180 lb (82 kg)	Fr	Columbia, South Carolina
G	11	David Efianayi	6 ft 2 in (1.88 m)	175 lb (79 kg)	RS So	Orlando, Florida
F/C	14	Brandon Miller	6 ft 6 in (1.98 m)	250 lb (113 kg)	RS So	Orlando, Florida
F	20	Tyrell Nelson	6 ft 7 in (2.01 m)	235 lb (107 kg)	Sr	Charlotte, North Carolina
F	21	Matthew Rodden	6 ft 6 in (1.98 m)	210 lb (95 kg)	RS So	Philadelphia, Pennsylvania
F	24	Patrick Zeck	6 ft 7 in (2.01 m)	225 lb (102 kg)	Fr	Atlanta, Georgia
F	25	DJ Laster	6 ft 6 in (1.98 m)	225 lb (102 kg)	So	Pensacola, Florida
C	31	L'Hassane Niangane	6 ft 10 in (2.08 m)	245 lb (111 kg)	Jr	Chalon-sur-Saône, France

Head coach

- Tim Craft (Florida)

Assistant coach(es)

- Jeremy Luther (North Greenville)
- Paul Hemrick (Georgia)
- DeAntoine Beasley (Tennessee Tech)

Legend

- (C) Team captain
- (S) Suspended
- (I) Ineligible
- (W) Walk-on
- Injured
- Current redshirt

Roster

== Schedule and results ==
Date time, TV	Rank^{#}	Opponent^{#}	Result	Record	Site (attendance) city, state
Non-conference regular season
11/11/2016*; 8:00 pm, ESPN3		at SMU; 2K Sports Classic	L 44–72	0–1	Moody Coliseum (6,852); University Park, TX
11/14/2016*; 8:00 pm, ACC Extra		at Pittsburgh; 2K Sports Classic - Campus Game	L 80–99	0–2	Petersen Events Center (4,614); Pittsburgh, PA
11/18/2016*; 11:00 am		vs. Eastern Michigan; 2K Sports Classic	L 68–76	0–3	Indiana Farmers Coliseum (843); Indianapolis, IN
11/19/2016*; 11:00 am		vs. Howard; 2K Sports Classic	W 94–78	1–3	Indiana Farmers Coliseum (863); Indianapolis, IN
11/22/2016*; 11:00 am		Toccoa Falls	W 103–53	2–3	Paul Porter Arena (2,150); Boiling Springs, NC
11/25/2016*; 7:00 pm, SECN+		at Georgia	L 59–77	2–4	Stegeman Coliseum (7,069); Athens, GA
11/29/2016*; 7:00 pm		Coker	W 102–54	3–4	Paul Porter Arena (1,123); Boiling Springs, NC
12/03/2016*; 7:00 pm		at VMI	W 86–68	4–4	Cameron Hall (1,097); Lexington, VA
12/07/2016*; 7:00 pm		Hampton	W 69–63	5–4	Paul Porter Arena (1,189); Boiling Springs, NC
12/10/2016*; 3:00 pm		Furman	L 65–68	5–5	Paul Porter Arena (1,539); Boiling Springs, NC
12/15/2016*; 7:00 pm		Warren Wilson	W 95–45	6–5	Paul Porter Arena (589); Boiling Springs, NC
12/18/2016*; 2:00 pm, ESPNU		at Nebraska	W 70–62	7–5	Pinnacle Bank Arena (14,333); Lincoln, NE
12/21/2016*; 8:00 pm, FSKC		at Kansas State	L 54–67	7–6	Bramlage Coliseum (11,602); Manhattan, KS
Big South regular season
12/29/2016; 7:00 pm		High Point	L 64–71	7–7 (0–1)	Paul Porter Arena (1,014); Boiling Springs, NC
12/31/2016; 7:00 pm		at UNC Asheville	L 85–90 ^{OT}	7–8 (0–2)	Kimmel Arena (1,491); Asheville, NC
01/04/2017; 7:00 pm		at Radford	W 70–59	8–8 (1–2)	Dedmon Center (733); Radford, VA
01/07/2017; 4:30 pm		Charleston Southern	W 79–75	9–8 (2–2)	Paul Porter Arena (125); Boiling Springs, NC
01/11/2017; 7:00 pm		Campbell	L 60–76	9–9 (2–3)	Paul Porter Arena (1,291); Boiling Springs, NC
01/14/2017; 2:00 pm		at Longwood	W 85–79	10–9 (3–3)	Willett Hall (1,118); Farmville, VA
01/19/2017; 7:00 pm		at Liberty	L 62–65	10–10 (3–4)	Vines Center (1,974); Lynchburg, VA
01/21/2017; 3:00 pm		Presbyterian	W 78–61	11–10 (4–4)	Paul Porter Arena (1,457); Boiling Springs, NC
01/26/2017; 7:00 pm		Winthrop	L 70–72	11–11 (4–5)	Paul Porter Arena (1,781); Boiling Springs, NC
01/28/2017; 5:30 pm		at Charleston Southern	W 85–76	12–11 (5–5)	CSU Field House (707); North Charleston, SC
02/01/2017; 7:00 pm		at Campbell	W 80–68	13–11 (6–5)	Gore Arena (1,473); Buies Creek, NC
02/04/2017; 3:00 pm		Longwood	W 90–64	14–11 (7–5)	Paul Porter Arena (1,029); Boiling Springs, NC
02/09/2017; 7:00 pm		Liberty	L 87–92 ^{2OT}	14–12 (7–6)	Paul Porter Arena (1,204); Boiling Springs, NC
02/11/2017; 2:00 pm		at Winthrop	L 71–77	14–13 (7–7)	Winthrop Coliseum (1,567); Rock Hill, SC
02/15/2017; 7:00 pm, ESPN3		Radford	W 70–59	15–13 (8–7)	Paul Porter Arena (906); Boiling Springs, NC
02/18/2017; 7:00 pm		at Presbyterian	W 84–56	16–13 (9–7)	Templeton Center; Clinton, SC
02/23/2017; 7:00 pm, ESPNU		UNC Asheville	W 81–76	17–13 (10–7)	Paul Porter Arena (2,289); Boiling Springs, NC
02/25/2017; 4:00 pm		at High Point	W 88–86 ^{OT}	18–13 (11–7)	Millis Athletic Center (1,174); High Point, NC
Big South tournament
03/02/2017; 9:00 pm, ESPN3	(4)	vs. (5) High Point; Quarterfinals	W 91–55	19–13	Winthrop Coliseum (2,556); Rock Hill, SC
03/03/2017; 7:00 pm, ESPN3	(4)	at (1) Winthrop; Semifinals	L 77–80 ^{OT}	19–14	Winthrop Coliseum (3,008); Rock Hill, SC
*Non-conference game. ^{#}Rankings from AP Poll. (#) Tournament seedings in parentheses. All times are in Eastern Time Source.
