= 2016–17 Radford Highlanders men's basketball team =

American college basketball season

2016–17 Radford Highlanders men's basketball
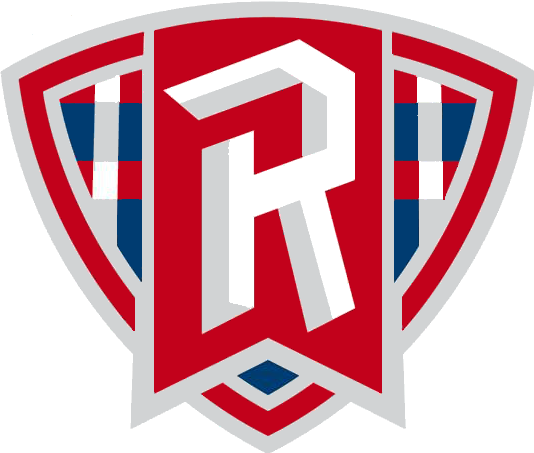
- Conference: Big South Conference
- Record: 14–18 (8–10 Big South)
- Head coach: Mike Jones (6th season)
- Assistant coaches: Ron Jirsa; David Boyden; Donny Lind
- Home arena: Dedmon Center

2016–17 Big South men's basketball standings
	Conf.				Overall
Team	W		L	PCT	W		L	PCT
Winthrop †	15	–	3	.833	26	–	7	.788
UNC Asheville	15	–	3	.833	23	–	10	.697
Liberty	14	–	4	.778	21	–	14	.600
Gardner–Webb	11	–	7	.611	19	–	14	.576
High Point	9	–	9	.500	15	–	16	.484
Radford	8	–	10	.444	14	–	18	.438
Campbell	7	–	11	.389	19	–	18	.514
Charleston Southern	7	–	11	.389	12	–	19	.387
Longwood	3	–	15	.167	6	–	24	.200
Presbyterian	1	–	17	.056	5	–	25	.167
† 2017 Big South tournament winner

The 2016–17 Radford Highlanders men's basketball team represented Radford University during the 2016–17 NCAA Division I men's basketball season. The Highlanders, led by sixth year head coach Mike Jones, played their home games at the Dedmon Center in Radford, Virginia as members of the Big South Conference. They finished the season 14–18, 8–10 in Big South play to finish in a sixth place. They received the No. 6 seed in the Big South tournament where they defeated Liberty in the quarterfinals to advance to the semifinals where they lost to Campbell.

== Previous season ==
The Highlanders finished the 2015–16 season 16–15, 9–9 in Big South play to finish in seventh place. They lost to Presbyterian in the first round of the Big South tournament.

== Roster ==
2016–17 Radford Highlanders men's basketball team
Players
Coaches

Pos.	#	Name	Height	Weight	Year	Hometown
G	1	Carlik Jones	6 ft 0 in (1.83 m)	170 lb (77 kg)	Fr	Cincinnati, Ohio
G	3	Christian Bradford	6 ft 1 in (1.85 m)	165 lb (75 kg)	Jr	Columbus, Georgia
G	4	Devin Cooper	6 ft 1 in (1.85 m)	175 lb (79 kg)	So	Charlotte, North Carolina
G	5	Donald Hicks	6 ft 3 in (1.91 m)	170 lb (77 kg)	Fr	Chesapeake, Virginia
G	10	Caleb Tanner	6 ft 1 in (1.85 m)	170 lb (77 kg)	So	Floyd, Virginia
F	11	Dominique Williams	6 ft 6 in (1.98 m)	205 lb (93 kg)	Jr	Washington, D.C.
G	14	Justin Cousin	6 ft 0 in (1.83 m)	195 lb (88 kg)	RS Jr	Burlington, North Carolina
F	15	Devonnte Holland	6 ft 7 in (2.01 m)	240 lb (109 kg)	Fr	Martinsville, Virginia
G	20	Brian Rodriguez	6 ft 0 in (1.83 m)	160 lb (73 kg)	Sr	Harrisonburg, Virginia
F	22	Sterling Christy	6 ft 6 in (1.98 m)	205 lb (93 kg)	RS So	Williamsport, Maryland
F	24	Ed Polite, Jr.	6 ft 5 in (1.96 m)	200 lb (91 kg)	So	Lanham, Maryland
F	25	Christian Lutete	6 ft 4 in (1.93 m)	190 lb (86 kg)	So	Silver Spring, Maryland
C	32	Randy Phillips	6 ft 8 in (2.03 m)	240 lb (109 kg)	Jr	Jackson, Mississippi
C	45	Darius Bolstad	6 ft 8 in (2.03 m)	240 lb (109 kg)	So	Virginia Beach, Virginia

Head coach

- Mike Jones (Howard)

Assistant coach(es)

- Ron Jirsa (Gettysburg)
- David Boyden (Western Kentucky)
- Donny Lind (Loyola (MD))

Legend

- (C) Team captain
- (S) Suspended
- (I) Ineligible
- (W) Walk-on
- Injured
- Current redshirt

Roster

== Schedule ==
Date time, TV	Rank^{#}	Opponent^{#}	Result	Record	Site (attendance) city, state
Non-conference Regular season
11/11/2016*; 7:30 pm, ACC Extra		at Wake Forest	W 80–59	0–1	LJVM Coliseum (7,233); Winston-Salem, NC
11/16/2016*; 7:00 pm		Central Penn	W 91–69	1–1	Dedmon Center (1,540); Radford, VA
11/20/2016*; 7:00 pm		at Akron; Savannah Invitational	L 41–88	1–2	James A. Rhodes Arena (2,986); Akron, OH
11/22/2016*; 7:00 pm, ESPN3		at Mercer; Savannah Invitational	L 47–58	1–3	Hawkins Arena (2,572); Macon, GA
11/25/2016*; 12:00 pm		vs. Stetson; Savannah Invitational	W 80–66 ^{OT}	2–3	Savannah Civic Center (491); Savannah, GA
11/26/2016*; 2:30 pm		vs. Georgia Southern; Savannah Invitational	L 64–65	2–4	Savannah Civic Center; Savannah, GA
11/30/2016*; 7:00 pm		VMI	W 74–67	3–4	Dedmon Center (1,329); Radford, VA
12/04/2016*; 2:00 pm, RSN		at No. 3 North Carolina	L 50–95	3–5	Dean Smith Center (14,230); Chapel Hill, NC
12/10/2016*; 4:00 pm		Elon	W 68–56	4–5	Dedmon Center (1,177); Radford, VA
12/17/2016*; 2:00 pm		at UNC Wilmington	L 64–100	4–6	Trask Coliseum (4,481); Wilmington, NC
12/20/2016*; 7:00 pm, Nexstar		at No. 11 West Virginia	L 57–84	4–7	WVU Coliseum (8,311); Morgantown, WV
12/23/2016*; 3:00 pm		Grace	W 82–58	5–7	Dedmon Center (857); Radford, VA
Big South Conference regular season
12/29/2016; 7:00 pm		UNC Asheville	W 80–77 ^{OT}	6–7 (1–0)	Dedmon Center (807); Radford, VA
12/31/2016; 12:00 pm		at Winthrop	W 82–80	7–7 (2–0)	Winthrop Coliseum (1,199); Rock Hill, SC
01/04/2017; 7:00 pm		Gardner–Webb	L 59–70	7–8 (2–1)	Dedmon Center (733); Radford, VA
01/07/2017; 7:00 pm		at Presbyterian	W 76–63	8–8 (3–1)	Templeton Center (251); Clinton, SC
01/11/2017; 7:30 pm		at Charleston Southern	L 64–70	8–9 (3–2)	CSU Field House (689); North Charleston, SC
01/14/2017; 4:30 pm		Liberty	L 64–71 ^{OT}	8–10 (3–3)	Dedmon Center (1,425); Radford, VA
01/19/2017; 7:00 pm		at Longwood	W 72–60	9–10 (4–3)	Willett Hall (1,318); Farmville, VA
01/21/2017; 12:00 pm, ASN		High Point	L 58–61	9–11 (4–4)	Dedmon Center (1,511); Radford, VA
01/26/2017; 7:00 pm		Campbell	L 61–78	9–12 (4–5)	Dedmon Center (2,203); Radford, VA
01/28/2017; 12:00 pm, ASN		at UNC Asheville	L 69–80	9–13 (4–6)	Kimmel Arena (423); Asheville, NC
02/01/2017; 7:00 pm		Winthrop	L 65–81	9–14 (4–7)	Dedmon Center (1,131); Radford, VA
02/04/2017; 7:00 pm, ASN		at Liberty	L 54–57	9–15 (4–8)	Vines Center (3,022); Lynchburg, VA
02/09/2017; 7:00 pm		Charleston Southern	W 79–67	10–15 (5–8)	Dedmon Center (1,178); Radford, VA
02/11/2017; 7:00 pm		at High Point	W 69–68 ^{OT}	11–15 (6–8)	Millis Athletic Center (1,141); High Point, NC
02/15/2017; 7:00 pm, ESPN3		at Gardner–Webb	L 59–70	11–16 (6–9)	Paul Porter Arena (906); Boiling Springs, NC
02/18/2017; 4:30 pm, ESPN3		Longwood	W 79–72	12–16 (7–9)	Dedmon Center (1,783); Radford, VA
02/23/2017; 7:00 pm		Presbyterian	W 59–57	13–16 (8–9)	Dedmon Center (1,448); Radford, VA
02/25/2017; 4:30 pm		at Campbell	L 58–61	13–17 (8–10)	Gore Arena (1,979); Buies Creek, NC
Big South tournament
03/02/2017; 7:00 pm, ESPN3	(6)	vs. (3) Liberty; Quarterfinals	W 56–52	14–17	Winthrop Coliseum (729); Rock Hill, SC
03/03/2017; 6:00 pm, ESPN3	(6)	vs. (7) Campbell; Semifinals	L 50–66	14–18	Winthrop Coliseum (3,008); Rock Hill, SC
*Non-conference game. ^{#}Rankings from AP Poll. (#) Tournament seedings in parentheses. All times are in Eastern Time Source.
