= 2016–17 Charleston Southern Buccaneers men's basketball team =

American college basketball season

2016–17 Charleston Southern Buccaneers men's basketball
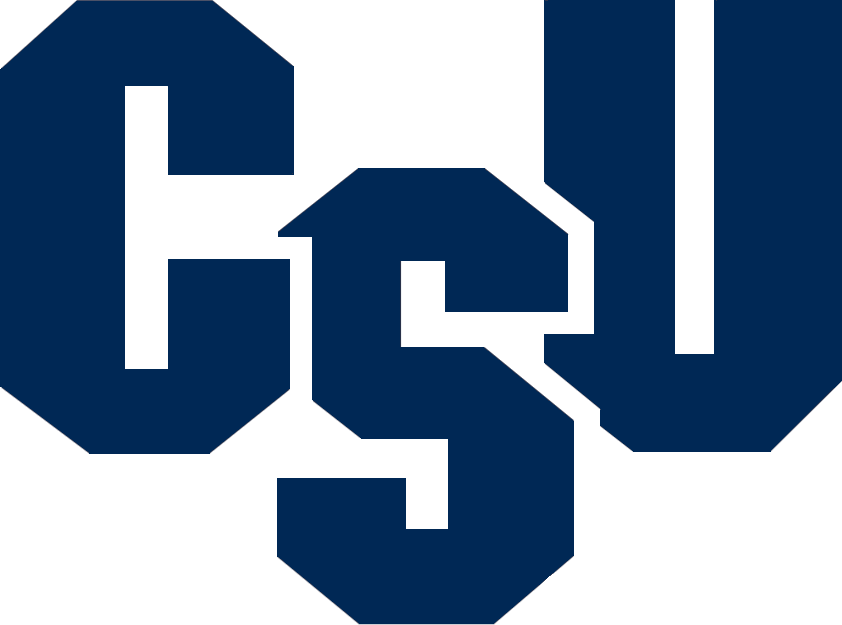
- Conference: Big South Conference
- Record: 12–19 (7–11 Big South)
- Head coach: Barclay Radebaugh (12th season)
- Assistant coaches: BJ McKie; Ahmad Smith; Joey Murdock
- Home arena: CSU Field House

2016–17 Big South men's basketball standings
	Conf.				Overall
Team	W		L	PCT	W		L	PCT
Winthrop †	15	–	3	.833	26	–	7	.788
UNC Asheville	15	–	3	.833	23	–	10	.697
Liberty	14	–	4	.778	21	–	14	.600
Gardner–Webb	11	–	7	.611	19	–	14	.576
High Point	9	–	9	.500	15	–	16	.484
Radford	8	–	10	.444	14	–	18	.438
Campbell	7	–	11	.389	19	–	18	.514
Charleston Southern	7	–	11	.389	12	–	19	.387
Longwood	3	–	15	.167	6	–	24	.200
Presbyterian	1	–	17	.056	5	–	25	.167
† 2017 Big South tournament winner

The 2016–17 Charleston Southern Buccaneers men's basketball team represented Charleston Southern University during the 2016–17 NCAA Division I men's basketball season. The Buccaneers, led by 12th-year head coach Barclay Radebaugh, played their home games at the CSU Field House in North Charleston, South Carolina as members of the Big South Conference. They finished the season 12–19, 7–11 in Big South play to finish in a tie for seventh place. They defeated Presbyterian in the first round of the Big South tournament before losing to Winthrop in the quarterfinals.

== Previous season ==
The Buccaneers finished the 2015–16 season 9–21, 5–13 in Big South play to finish in a four-way tie for eighth place. They lost in the first round of the Big South tournament to Longwood.

== Roster ==
2016–17 Charleston Southern Buccaneers men's basketball team
Players
Coaches

Pos.	#	Name	Height	Weight	Year	Hometown
G	0	Raemond Robinson	6 ft 2 in (1.88 m)	190 lb (86 kg)	RS Sr	Goose Creek, South Carolina
G	1	Armel Potter	6 ft 1 in (1.85 m)	180 lb (82 kg)	So	Marietta, Georgia
G	2	Cortez Mitchell	6 ft 2 in (1.88 m)	180 lb (82 kg)	Jr	Jackson, Mississippi
G	4	Patrick Wallace	6 ft 1 in (1.85 m)	170 lb (77 kg)	Sr	Charlotte, North Carolina
F	5	Jamar Martin	6 ft 5 in (1.96 m)	215 lb (98 kg)	Jr	Toronto, Ontario, Canada
F/C	10	Abdul Sarki	6 ft 9 in (2.06 m)	230 lb (104 kg)	Jr	Minna, Nigeria
G	11	Christian Keeling	6 ft 3 in (1.91 m)	175 lb (79 kg)	Fr	Augusta, Georgia
F	12	Antwan Maxwell, Jr.	6 ft 7 in (2.01 m)	220 lb (100 kg)	Fr	Savannah, Georgia
F	13	Jordan Jones	6 ft 8 in (2.03 m)	205 lb (93 kg)	Fr	Baltimore, Maryland
G	15	TayVaughn Major	6 ft 2 in (1.88 m)	150 lb (68 kg)	Fr	North Charleston, South Carolina
G	20	Brock Johnson	5 ft 10 in (1.78 m)	160 lb (73 kg)	Fr	Castle Rock, Washington
G	21	Jamaal David	6 ft 6 in (1.98 m)	190 lb (86 kg)	Fr	Potomac, Maryland
G	22	Zach Durkee	6 ft 3 in (1.91 m)	180 lb (82 kg)	RS Jr	Anderson, South Carolina
F	23	Javis Howard	6 ft 8 in (2.03 m)	220 lb (100 kg)	Jr	Irmo, South Carolina
F	24	Ugo Mmonu	6 ft 6 in (1.98 m)	205 lb (93 kg)	Sr	Osina, Nigeria
G	30	Jamal Thomas	6 ft 3 in (1.91 m)	200 lb (91 kg)	Jr	Toronto, Ontario, Canada

Head coach

- Barclay Radebaugh (East Tennessee St.)

Assistant coach(es)

- BJ McKie (South Carolina)
- Ahmad Smith (Appalachian St.)
- Joey Murdock (West Florida)

Legend

- (C) Team captain
- (S) Suspended
- (I) Ineligible
- (W) Walk-on
- Injured
- Current redshirt

Roster

== Schedule and results ==
Date time, TV	Rank^{#}	Opponent^{#}	Result	Record	Site (attendance) city, state
Non-conference regular season
11/12/2016*; 1:00 pm, ACCN Extra		at Florida State	L 67–88	0–1	Donald L. Tucker Center; Tallahassee, FL
11/15/2016*; 7:30 pm		Columbia International	W 90–53	1–1	CSU Field House; North Charleston, SC
11/19/2016*; 5:30 pm		USC Upstate	L 77–79	1–2	CSU Field House (616); North Charleston, SC
11/22/2016*; 8:00 pm		at Abilene Christian	W 66–65	2–2	Moody Coliseum (1,585); Abilene, TX
11/26/2016*; 7:30 pm		Toccoa Falls	W 101–54	3–2	CSU Field House (215); North Charleston, SC
11/29/2016*; 7:00 pm, SECN		at Alabama	L 46–76	3–3	Coleman Coliseum (11,425); Tuscaloosa, AL
12/03/2016*; 5:30 pm		Abilene Christian	L 82–85 ^{OT}	3–4	CSU Field House (671); North Charleston, SC
12/10/2016*; 5:30 pm		Johnson & Wales (NC)	W 100–53	4–4	CSU Field House (305); North Charleston, SC
12/13/2016*; 7:00 pm, ESPN3		at VMI	L 83–88	4–5	Cameron Hall (902); Lexington, VA
12/17/2016*; 1:00 pm, SECN		at Georgia	L 64–84	4–6	Stegeman Coliseum (6,882); Athens, GA
12/20/2016*; 9:00 pm, ESPNU		at Virginia Tech	L 59–87	4–7	Cassell Coliseum (5,249); Blacksburg, VA
Big South regular season
12/29/2016; 7:30 pm		Winthrop	L 68–84	4–8 (0–1)	CSU Field House (665); North Charleston, SC
12/31/2016; 4:00 pm		Liberty	L 70–81	4–9 (0–2)	CSU Field House (367); North Charleston, SC
01/04/2017; 7:00 pm		at Campbell	L 82–92	4–10 (0–3)	Gore Arena (1,004); Buies Creek, NC
01/07/2017; 4:30 pm		at Gardner–Webb	L 75–79	4–11 (0–4)	Paul Porter Arena (125); Boiling Springs, NC
01/11/2017; 7:30 pm		Radford	W 70–64	5–11 (1–4)	CSU Field House (689); North Charleston, SC
01/14/2017; 5:30 pm		UNC Asheville	L 67–76	5–12 (1–5)	CSU Field House (755); North Charleston, SC
01/19/2017; 7:00 pm		at Presbyterian	W 73–52	6–12 (2–5)	Templeton Center (635); Clinton, SC
01/21/2017; 5:30 pm		Longwood	W 76–61	7–12 (3–5)	CSU Field House (727); North Charleston, SC
01/26/2017; 7:00 pm		at High Point	L 69–72 ^{OT}	7–13 (3–6)	Millis Athletic Center (1,137); High Point, NC
01/28/2017; 5:30 pm		Gardner–Webb	L 76–85	7–14 (3–7)	CSU Field House (707); North Charleston, SC
02/01/2017; 7:00 pm		at UNC Asheville	L 73–91	7–15 (3–8)	Kimmel Arena (1,333); Asheville, NC
02/04/2017; 5:30 pm, 665		Presbyterian	W 71–65 ^{OT}	8–15 (4–8)	CSU Field House; North Charleston, SC
02/09/2017; 7:00 pm		at Radford	L 67–79	8–16 (4–9)	Dedmon Center (1,178); Radford, VA
02/11/2017; 2:00 pm, ESPN3		at Liberty	L 69–76	8–17 (4–10)	Vines Center (2,381); Lynchburg, VA
02/15/2017; 7:30 pm		Campbell	W 72–69	9–17 (5–10)	CSU Field House (415); North Charleston, SC
02/18/2017; 5:30 pm		High Point	W 76–75	10–17 (6–10)	CSU Field House (802); North Charleston, SC
02/23/2017; 6:30 pm		at Winthrop	L 72–86	10–18 (6–11)	Winthrop Coliseum (1,969); Rock Hill, SC
02/25/2017; 2:00 pm		at Longwood	W 86–78	11–18 (7–11)	Willett Hall (1,088); Farmville, VA
Big South tournament
02/28/2017; 7:00 pm	(8)	(9) Longwood; First round	W 79–74	12–18	CSU Field House (815); North Charleston, SC
03/02/2017; 7:00 pm, ESPN3	(8)	at (1) Winthrop; Quarterfinals	L 78–81	12–19	Winthrop Coliseum (2,556); Rock Hill, SC
*Non-conference game. ^{#}Rankings from AP Poll. (#) Tournament seedings in parentheses. All times are in Eastern Time Source.
