= 2016–17 Campbell Fighting Camels men's basketball team =

American college basketball season

2016–17 Campbell Fighting Camels men's basketball
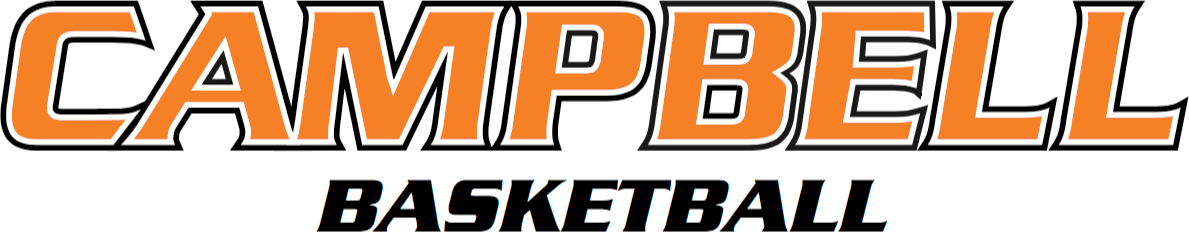

CIT, Quarterfinals
- Conference: Big South Conference
- Record: 19–18 (7–11 Big South)
- Head coach: Kevin McGeehan (4th season)
- Assistant coaches: Peter Thomas; Mike Magpayo; Kevin Smith
- Home arena: Gore Arena

2016–17 Big South men's basketball standings
	Conf.				Overall
Team	W		L	PCT	W		L	PCT
Winthrop †	15	–	3	.833	26	–	7	.788
UNC Asheville	15	–	3	.833	23	–	10	.697
Liberty	14	–	4	.778	21	–	14	.600
Gardner–Webb	11	–	7	.611	19	–	14	.576
High Point	9	–	9	.500	15	–	16	.484
Radford	8	–	10	.444	14	–	18	.438
Campbell	7	–	11	.389	19	–	18	.514
Charleston Southern	7	–	11	.389	12	–	19	.387
Longwood	3	–	15	.167	6	–	24	.200
Presbyterian	1	–	17	.056	5	–	25	.167
† 2017 Big South tournament winner

The 2016–17 Campbell Fighting Camels men's basketball team represented Campbell University during the 2016–17 NCAA Division I men's basketball season. The Fighting Camels were led by fourth-year head coach Kevin McGeehan and played their home games at Gore Arena in Buies Creek, North Carolina as members of the Big South Conference. They finished the season 19–18, 7–11 in Big South play to finish in a tie for seventh place. Due to tiebreakers, they received the No. 7 seed in the Big South tournament, where they defeated Presbyterian, UNC Asheville, and Radford to advance to the championship game, where they lost to Winthrop. They received an invitation to the CollegeInsider.com Tournament, where they defeated Houston Baptist and UT Martin before losing in the quarterfinals to Furman.

== Previous season ==
The Fighting Camels finished the 2015–16 season 12–18, 5–13 in Big South play to finish in four-way tie for eighth place. They lost in the first round of the Big South tournament to Gardner–Webb.

== Roster ==
2016–17 Campbell Fighting Camels men's basketball team
Players
Coaches

Pos.	#	Name	Height	Weight	Year	Hometown
G	0	Kyre' Hamer	6 ft 2 in (1.88 m)	200 lb (91 kg)	Sr	Stone Mountain, Georgia
F	1	Damontez Oliver	6 ft 6 in (1.98 m)	220 lb (100 kg)	Fr	Glen Allen, Virginia
G	3	Chris Clemons	5 ft 9 in (1.75 m)	165 lb (75 kg)	So	Raleigh, North Carolina
F	4	Khadre Lane	6 ft 5 in (1.96 m)	200 lb (91 kg)	So	Lawrence, Kansas
F	5	Austin Burnette	6 ft 7 in (2.01 m)	220 lb (100 kg)	Fr	Raleigh, North Carolina
G	10	Nick Parker	6 ft 3 in (1.91 m)	185 lb (84 kg)	Jr	Dunn, North Carolina
G	11	Josh Crumpler	5 ft 9 in (1.75 m)	165 lb (75 kg)	Sr	Fuquay-Varina, North Carolina
F	12	Jon Ander Cuadra	6 ft 8 in (2.03 m)	210 lb (95 kg)	So	Vitoria-Gasteiz, Spain
G	13	Quinton Ray	6 ft 0 in (1.83 m)	195 lb (88 kg)	Sr	Clayton, North Carolina
F	14	Nick Greely	6 ft 7 in (2.01 m)	235 lb (107 kg)	Fr	Fairmont, West Virginia
F	15	Mogga Lado	6 ft 8 in (2.03 m)	215 lb (98 kg)	Jr	Nampa, Idaho
G	22	Cory Gensler	6 ft 4 in (1.93 m)	190 lb (86 kg)	Fr	Cary, North Carolina
G	23	Jacob Talbert	6 ft 0 in (1.83 m)	195 lb (88 kg)	Sr	Southern Pines, North Carolina
G	24	Gray Cheers	6 ft 3 in (1.91 m)	175 lb (79 kg)	So	Supply, North Carolina
F	25	Andrew Eudy	6 ft 7 in (2.01 m)	210 lb (95 kg)	So	Lebanon, Pennsylvania
G	30	Wyatt Self	6 ft 2 in (1.88 m)	175 lb (79 kg)	Fr	Davidson, North Carolina
F	32	Shane Whitfield	6 ft 7 in (2.01 m)	210 lb (95 kg)	RS Jr	Raleigh, North Carolina
G	34	Marcus Burk	6 ft 3 in (1.91 m)	205 lb (93 kg)	Fr	Indianapolis, Indiana

Head coach

- Kevin McGeehan (Gettysburg)

Assistant coach(es)

- Peter Thomas (Richmond)
- Mike Magpayo (UC Santa Barbara)
- Kevin Smith (Richmond)

Legend

- (C) Team captain
- (S) Suspended
- (I) Ineligible
- (W) Walk-on
- Injured
- Current redshirt

Roster

== Schedule and results ==
Date time, TV	Rank^{#}	Opponent^{#}	Result	Record	Site (attendance) city, state
Non-conference regular season
11/11/2016*; 8:00 pm, FSOK+		at Oklahoma State	L 65–102	0–1	Gallagher-Iba Arena (6,126); Stillwater, OK
11/15/2016*; 7:00 pm		Bridgewater	W 101–45	1–1	Gore Arena (1,232); Buies Creek, NC
11/19/2016*; 1:00 pm		at Morgan State	L 66–82	1–2	Talmadge L. Hill Field House (804); Baltimorem MD
11/21/2016*; 7:00 pm		Samford	L 53–66	1–3	Gore Arena (1,863); Buies Creek, NC
11/26/2016*; 1:00 pm		at VMI	W 67–53	2–3	Cameron Hall (912); Lexington, VA
11/28/2016*; 7:00 pm		Allen; Holy City Hoops Classic	W 92–60	3–3	Gore Arena (979); Buies Creek, NC
12/02/2016*; 7:00 pm		vs. USC Upstate; Holy City Hoops Classic	L 73–80 ^{OT}	3–4	McAlister Field House (270); Charleston, SC
12/03/2016*; 5:00 pm		vs. Colgate; Holy City Hoops Classic	W 73–71 ^{OT}	4–4	McAlister Field House (276); Charleston, SC
12/04/2016*; 3:00 pm		at The Citadel; Holy City Hoops Classic	W 97–91	5–4	McAlister Field House (572); Charleston, SC
12/14/2016*; 7:00 pm		UNC Wilmington	L 75–96	5–5	Gore Arena (1,827); Buies Creek, NC
12/19/2016*; 7:00 pm		Johnson & Wales (NC)	W 90–59	6–5	Gore Arena (1,072); Buies Creek, NC
12/22/2016*; 2:00 pm		Stetson	W 81–72	7–5	Gore Arena (1,034); Buies Creek, NC
Big South regular season
12/29/2016; 7:00 pm		at Longwood	L 77–79	7–6 (0–1)	Willett Hall (718); Farmville, VA
12/31/2016; 2:00 pm		Presbyterian	W 69–58	8–6 (1–1)	Gore Arena (1,427); Buies Creek, NC
01/04/2017; 7:00 pm		Charleston Southern	W 92–82	9–6 (2–1)	Gore Arena (1,004); Buies Creek, NC
01/07/2017; 2:00 pm, ESPN3		at Liberty	L 54–61	9–7 (2–2)	Vines Center (775); Lynchburg, VA
01/11/2017; 7:00 pm		at Gardner–Webb	W 76–60	10–7 (3–2)	Paul Porter Arena (1,291); Boiling Springs, NC
01/14/2017; 2:00 pm		Winthrop	L 63–72	10–8 (3–3)	Gore Arena (2,283); Buies Creek, NC
01/19/2017; 7:00 pm		High Point	L 78–83	10–9 (3–4)	Gore Arena (2,180); Buies Creek, NC
01/21/2017; 4:30 pm		at UNC Asheville	L 56–72	10–10 (3–5)	Kimmel Arena (2,203); Asheville, NC
01/26/2017; 7:00 pm		at Radford	W 78–61	11–10 (4–5)	Dedmon Center (2,203); Radford, VA
01/28/2017; 2:00 pm		Liberty	L 40–72	11–11 (4–6)	Gore Arena (2,413); Buies Creek, NC
02/01/2017; 7:00 pm		Gardner–Webb	L 68–80	11–12 (4–7)	Gore Arena (1,473); Buies Creek, NC
02/04/2017; 2:00 pm		at Winthrop	L 62–76	11–13 (4–8)	Winthrop Coliseum (2,481); Rock Hill, SC
02/09/2017; 7:00 pm		Longwood	W 83–79	12–13 (5–8)	Gore Arena (1,241); Buies Creek, NC
02/11/2017; 4:30 pm		at Presbyterian	W 70–57	13–13 (6–8)	Templeton Center (865); Clinton, SC
02/15/2017; 7:30 pm		at Charleston Southern	L 69–72	13–14 (6–9)	CSU Field House (415); North Charleston, SC
02/18/2017; 2:00 pm		UNC Asheville	L 53–66	13–15 (6–10)	Gore Arena (1,584); Buies Creek, NC
02/23/2017; 7:00 pm		at High Point	L 49–59	13–16 (6–11)	Millis Athletic Center (1,404); High Point, NC
02/25/2017; 4:30 pm		Radford	W 61–58	14–16 (7–11)	Gore Arena (1,979); Buies Creek, NC
Big South tournament
02/28/2017; 7:00 pm	(7)	(10) Presbyterian; First round	W 81–62	15–16	Gore Arena (1,328); Buies Creek, NC
03/02/2017; 1:00 pm, ESPN3	(7)	vs. (2) UNC Asheville; Quarterfinals	W 81–79	16–16	Winthrop Coliseum (729); Rock Hill, SC
03/03/2017; 6:00 pm, ESPN3	(7)	vs. (6) Radford; Semifinals	W 66–50	17–16	Winthrop Coliseum (3,008); Rock Hill, SC
03/05/2017; 1:00 pm, ESPN	(7)	at (1) Winthrop; Championship game	L 59–76	17–17	Winthrop Coliseum (5,109); Rock Hill, SC
CIT
03/14/2017*; 7:00 pm, Facebook Live		Houston Baptist; First Round	W 98–79	18–17	Gore Arena (1,735); Buies Creek, NC
03/20/2017*; 7:00 pm, Facebook Live		UT Martin; Second Round	W 73–56	19–17	Gore Arena (2,031); Buies Creek, NC
03/25/2017*; 2:00 pm, Facebook Live		Furman; Quarterfinals	L 64–79	19–18	Gore Arena (1,920); Buies Creek, NC
*Non-conference game. ^{#}Rankings from AP Poll. (#) Tournament seedings in parentheses. All times are in Eastern Time Source.
