= Pat Kelsey =

American college basketball coach (born 1975)

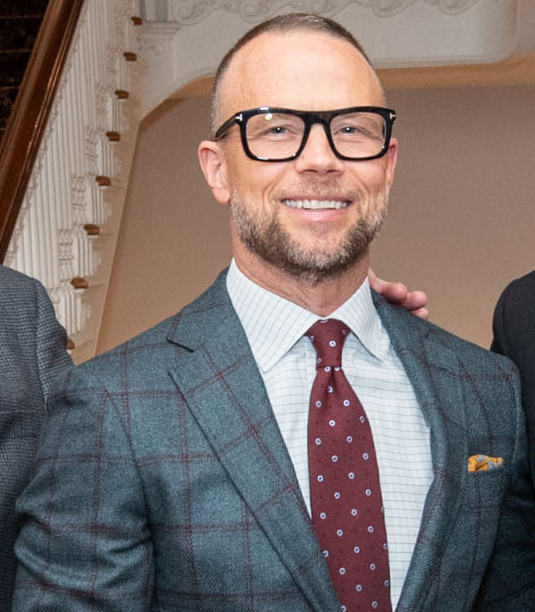
- Kelsey in 2023

Current position
- Title: Head coach
- Team: Louisville
- Conference: ACC
- Record: 53–20 (.726)

Biographical details
- Born: May 15, 1975 (age 51); Cincinnati, Ohio, U.S.

Playing career
- 1993–1994: Wyoming
- 1995–1998: Xavier
- Position: Point guard

Coaching career (HC unless noted)
- 1998–2001: Elder HS (assistant)
- 2004–2009: Wake Forest (assistant)
- 2009–2011: Xavier (associate HC)
- 2012–2021: Winthrop
- 2021–2024: Charleston
- 2024–present: Louisville

Administrative career (AD unless noted)
- 2001–2004: Wake Forest (dir. ops)

Head coaching record
- Overall: 314–142 (.689)
- Tournaments: 1–6 (NCAA Division I)

Accomplishments and honors

Championships
- 4× Big South regular season (2016, 2017, 2020, 2021); 3× Big South tournament (2017, 2020, 2021); 2× CAA regular season (2023, 2024); 2× CAA tournament (2023, 2024)

Awards
- Big South Coach of the Year (2021); CAA Coach of the Year (2024); ACC Coach of the Year (2025)

Patrick Kelsey (born May 15, 1975) is an American college basketball coach. He is the current head men's basketball coach at the University of Louisville. He previously served as head coach for the College of Charleston and Winthrop University.

== Playing career ==
Kelsey played high school basketball at Roger Bacon High School in Cincinnati, Ohio. He transferred to Elder High School for his senior year and in 1993 helped lead the team to a Division I state title. Kelsey began his collegiate career as a freshman guard at the University of Wyoming. He transferred to Xavier in 1994 where he played three seasons.

== Coaching career ==
=== Assistant coaching (2004–2011) ===
Kelsey began his career as an assistant coach at Wake Forest University and later Xavier University. During his time as an assistant coach, his teams earned an ACC regular season championship, five NCAA Tournament berths, an NIT berth, and a No. 1 national ranking in two different seasons. In 2010, College Bound Hoops ranked Kelsey eighth in the nation among college basketball assistants. Chris Mack, former A-10 and Big East Championship head coach, considered him to be one of the best assistant coaches in America.

As an assistant at Wake Forest, Kelsey coached a number of players who went on to have successful professional basketball careers, including NBA All-Stars Chris Paul and Jeff Teague. He coached Ish Smith, an All-ACC selection and player for the Houston Rockets, James Johnson, a two-time All-ACC selection and 17th overall draft pick by the Chicago Bulls in the 2009 NBA Draft, and Al-Farouq Aminu, a McDonald's All-America who was drafted eighth overall by the L.A. Clippers in the 2010 NBA Draft.

=== Winthrop (2012–2021) ===
As head coach at Winthrop University, Kelsey resurrected a winning tradition and became one of the winningest coaches in the history of the Big South Conference (ranked 2nd all-time with 110 conference wins). During his nine seasons, no other Big South program had more conference wins or wins overall. The program made four straight Big South Conference tournament title games (2014–17) and the Eagles claimed the 2017, 2020, and 2021 Big South Conference Championships. The 2016–17 Eagles claimed a share of the Big South regular season championship and defeated the Campbell Fighting Camels in the title game to earn Winthrop's 10th trip to the NCAA Tournament.

In 2017, Kelsey was hired as the head coach at Massachusetts, but returned to Winthrop two days after accepting the position, citing personal reasons. Kelsey informed UMass Athletic Director Ryan Bamford of his decision 25 minutes before the scheduled press conference to formally introduce Kelsey to the press and university community. Two days prior, Kelsey had signed an MoU with the university, which included a $1 million buyout clause should Kelsey leave before two years.

Kelsey's 2019–20 Eagles team secured the Big South regular season championship and defeated the Hampton Pirates in the conference championship game to earn what would have been Winthrop's 11th trip to the NCAA tournament. However, the 2020 NCAA tournament was canceled due to the COVID-19 pandemic. The 2020–21 Eagles started the season 16–0 and had a cumulative 21-game winning streak dating back to the prior season, which were both program records. They defeated Campbell in the conference tournament to earn their 11th NCAA Tournament bid. Following the season, Kelsey was named a finalist for the Jim Phelan Award (national coach of the year) and the Skip Prosser Man of the Year Award.

Under Kelsey, the program broke multiple school records and produced some of the best players in its history, including Keon Johnson, Winthrop's all-time leading scorer, and Xavier Cooks, Winthrop's all time leading rebounder and shot-blocker.

On March 25, 2021, Kelsey announced that he was leaving Winthrop to become head coach at the College of Charleston.

=== Charleston (2021–2024) ===
Over three seasons Kelsey led the Cougars to a 75–27 (.735) record, including a 31-win season in 2022–23, a record high for the program. The 2022–23 Cougars won the local Charleston Classic Tournament for the first time in program history, entered the AP Top 25 for the first time in two decades, went on a 20-game win streak to defeat rival UNC Wilmington in the 2023 CAA Tournament, and eventually fell to National Runner-Up San Diego State in the 2023 NCAA Tournament. For these efforts Kelsey was named USBWA Coach of the Year for District Three and NABC Coach of the Year for District Ten, a feat he would repeat in 2024.

Kelsey's 2023–24 Cougars went back-to-back as outright CAA Regular Season Champions and 2024 CAA Tournament Championships, eventually falling to Final Four Team Alabama in the 2024 NCAA Tournament. His 58 wins were the most in program history by a Cougars head coach over the course of two seasons, and he was the program's fastest head coach to reach 50 wins, doing so against Coastal Carolina on November 19, 2023. His 75th win was also his last for the Cougars, an overtime triumph against Stony Brook in the Championship Game of the CAA Tournament. Kelsey was named the Coastal Athletic Association Coach of the Year on March 7, 2024.

=== Louisville (2024–present) ===
On March 28, 2024, Kelsey was named the head men's basketball coach at Louisville, agreeing to a five-year contract.

In his first year, Kelsey took Louisville, which had been last place in the ACC in the previous 2 seasons, to an 18–2 conference record, and a second place finish. He led the Cardinals to numerous milestones, including their first victory at rival Virginia since 1990 on January 4, 2025, and a return to the AP Top 25 for the first time since 2021, ultimately finishing the regular season ranked No. 10 nationally. At the end of the season Kelsey was named ACC Coach of the Year and led Louisville back to the NCAA tournament for the first time since 2019.

In his second season, Louisville had high expectations due to landing 3 impactful transfers along with star 5-star true freshmen point guard Mikel Brown Jr. Despite getting off to a 7-0 start headlined by a win over in-state rival Kentucky Wildcats men's basketball, the Cardinals largely underperformed relative to their preseason expectation due to Brown missing 14 games, including all of the ACC and NCAA tournament, due to a persistent back injury. Despite some of the struggles Kelsey did lead 6-seeded Louisville to its first NCAA tournament win since 2017 over 11-seeded South Florida. Kesley's team fell to 3-seeded Michigan State 77-69 in the second round to cap off his second season.

== Newtown speech at Ohio State ==
In December 2012, after a game against Ohio State, Kelsey gave an impassioned speech about the Sandy Hook Elementary school shooting that had occurred just days prior. During the game's press conference, Kelsey spoke out about the tragedy and said "Parents, teachers, rabbis, priests, coaches, everybody needs to step up. This has to be a time for change.”

After a clip of the conference aired on ESPN, parents of a victim of the shooting reached out to Kelsey. He later participated in an event (Race4Chase triathlon) put on by the CMAK Sandy Hook Memorial Foundation. The family was honored at an Eagles basketball game on March 1, 2014. At the game, each Winthrop player wore the name of a child killed at Sandy Hook on the back of their jersey.

== Head coaching record ==
Record table
Season	Team	Overall	Conference	Standing	Postseason
Winthrop Eagles (Big South Conference) (2012–2021)
2012–13	Winthrop	14–17	6–10	5th (South)	
2013–14	Winthrop	20–13	10–6	T–2nd (South)	
2014–15	Winthrop	19–13	12–6	T–3rd	
2015–16	Winthrop	23–9	13–5	T–1st	
2016–17	Winthrop	26–7	15–3	T–1st	NCAA Division I Round of 64
2017–18	Winthrop	19–12	12–6	T–2nd	
2018–19	Winthrop	18–12	10–6	T–3rd	
2019–20	Winthrop	24–10	15–3	T–1st	NCAA Division I Canceled*
2020–21	Winthrop	23–2	17–1	1st	NCAA Division I Round of 64
Winthrop:		186–95 (.662)	110–46 (.705)		
Charleston Cougars (Coastal Athletic Association) (2021–2024)
2021–22	Charleston	17–15	8–10	6th	
2022–23	Charleston	31–4	16–2	T–1st	NCAA Division I Round of 64
2023–24	Charleston	27–8	15–3	1st	NCAA Division I Round of 64
Charleston:		75–27 (.735)	39–15 (.722)		
Louisville Cardinals (Atlantic Coast Conference) (2024–present)
2024–25	Louisville	27–8	18–2	T–2nd	NCAA Division I Round of 64
2025–26	Louisville	24–11	11–7	6th	NCAA Division I Round of 32
2026–27	Louisville	2–1	0–0		
Louisville:		53–20 (.726)	29–9 (.763)		
Total:		314–142 (.689)			

*The 2020 NCAA tournament was canceled due to concerns over the COVID-19 pandemic.

== Awards ==
- Big South Men's Basketball Coach of the Year (2020–21)
- CAA Men's Basketball Coach of the Year (2023–24)
- USBWA District III Coach of the Year (2022–23)
- 2x NABC District X Coach of the Year (2022–23, 2023–24)
- ACC Men's Basketball Coach of the Year (2024–25)
