= 2017 Big South Conference men's basketball tournament =

- Classification: Division I
- Season: 2016–17
- Teams: 10
- Site: Campus sites (first round); Winthrop Coliseum (quarterfinals, Semifinals, and Championship)
- Champions: Winthrop Eagles (11th title)
- Winning coach: Pat Kelsey (1st title)
- MVP: Keon Johnson (Winthrop)

2016–17 Big South men's basketball standings
	Conf.				Overall
Team	W		L	PCT	W		L	PCT
Winthrop †	15	–	3	.833	26	–	7	.788
UNC Asheville	15	–	3	.833	23	–	10	.697
Liberty	14	–	4	.778	21	–	14	.600
Gardner–Webb	11	–	7	.611	19	–	14	.576
High Point	9	–	9	.500	15	–	16	.484
Radford	8	–	10	.444	14	–	18	.438
Campbell	7	–	11	.389	19	–	18	.514
Charleston Southern	7	–	11	.389	12	–	19	.387
Longwood	3	–	15	.167	6	–	24	.200
Presbyterian	1	–	17	.056	5	–	25	.167
† 2017 Big South tournament winner

The 2017 Big South men's basketball tournament was the conference tournament for the Big South Conference. It was played between February 28, 2017 and March 5, 2017 at various campus sites. Winthrop defeated Campbell, 76–59, to win the tournament championship and receive the conference's automatic bid to the NCAA tournament.

== Sites ==
The first round was played at campus sites at the home of the higher seed. The quarterfinals and semifinals were played at No. 1-seeded Winthrop's Winthrop Coliseum in Rock Hill, South Carolina. The championship game was held at the home of the highest remaining seed, Winthrop's Winthrop Coliseum.

== Seeds ==
All 10 conference teams were eligible for the tournament. The top six teams receive a first round bye. Teams were seeded by record within the conference, with a tiebreaker system to seed teams with identical conference records.

Seed	School	Conference	Overall	Tiebreaker
1	Winthrop	15–3	23–6	1–1 vs UNCA, 2–0 vs Lib., 2–0 vs GW
2	UNC Asheville	15–3	23–8	1–1 vs Winth., 2–0 vs Lib., 1–1 vs GW
3	Liberty	14–4	19–12	
4	Gardner–Webb	11–7	18–13	
5	High Point	9–9	15–15	
6	Radford	8–10	13–17	
7	Campbell	7–11	14–16	1–1 vs CSU, 0–2 vs top 3 seeds, 1–1 vs GW
8	Charleston Southern	7–11	11–18	1–1 vs Camp., 0–2 vs top 3 seeds, 0–2 vs GW
9	Longwood	3–15	6–23	
10	Presbyterian	1–17	5–24	

== Schedule ==
Game	Time*	Matchup^{#}	Television	Score	Attendance
First round - Tuesday, February 28 Campus sites					
1	7:00 pm	No. 10 Presbyterian at No. 7 Campbell	BSN	62–81	1,328
2	7:00 pm	No. 9 Longwood at No. 8 Charleston Southern	BSN	74–79	815
Quarterfinals - Thursday, March 2 at Winthrop Coliseum					
3	1:00 pm	No. 2 UNC Asheville vs. No. 7 Campbell	ESPN3	79–81	1,694
4	3:00 pm	No. 3 Liberty vs. No. 6 Radford	ESPN3	52–56	729
5	7:00 pm	No. 1 Winthrop vs. No. 8 Charleston Southern	ESPN3	92–78	2,944
6	9:00 pm	No. 4 Gardner–Webb vs. No. 5 High Point	ESPN3	91–55	2,556
Semifinals - Friday, March 3 at Winthrop Coliseum					
7	6:00 pm	No. 7 Campbell vs. No. 6 Radford	ESPN3	66–50	1,593
8	8:00 pm	No. 1 Winthrop vs. No. 4 Gardner–Webb	ESPN3	80–77	3,008
Championship - Sunday, March 5 at Winthrop Coliseum					
9	1:00 pm	No. 7 Campbell vs. No. 1 Winthrop	ESPN	59–76	5,109
*Game times in ET. #-Rankings denote tournament seeding.

== Bracket ==
First round Tuesday, February 28
8	Charleston Southern	79
9	Longwood	74
7	Campbell	81
10	Presbyterian	62

Quarterfinals; Thursday, March 2
1	Winthrop	92
8	Charleston Southern	78
4	Gardner–Webb	91
5	High Point	55
2	UNC Asheville	79
7	Campbell	81
3	Liberty	52
6	Radford	56

Semifinals; Friday, March 3
1	Winthrop	80*
4	Gardner–Webb	77
7	Campbell	66
6	Radford	50

Championship; Sunday, March 5
1	Winthrop	76
7	Campbell	59
