= Willett Hall =

Academic building in Virginia, United States

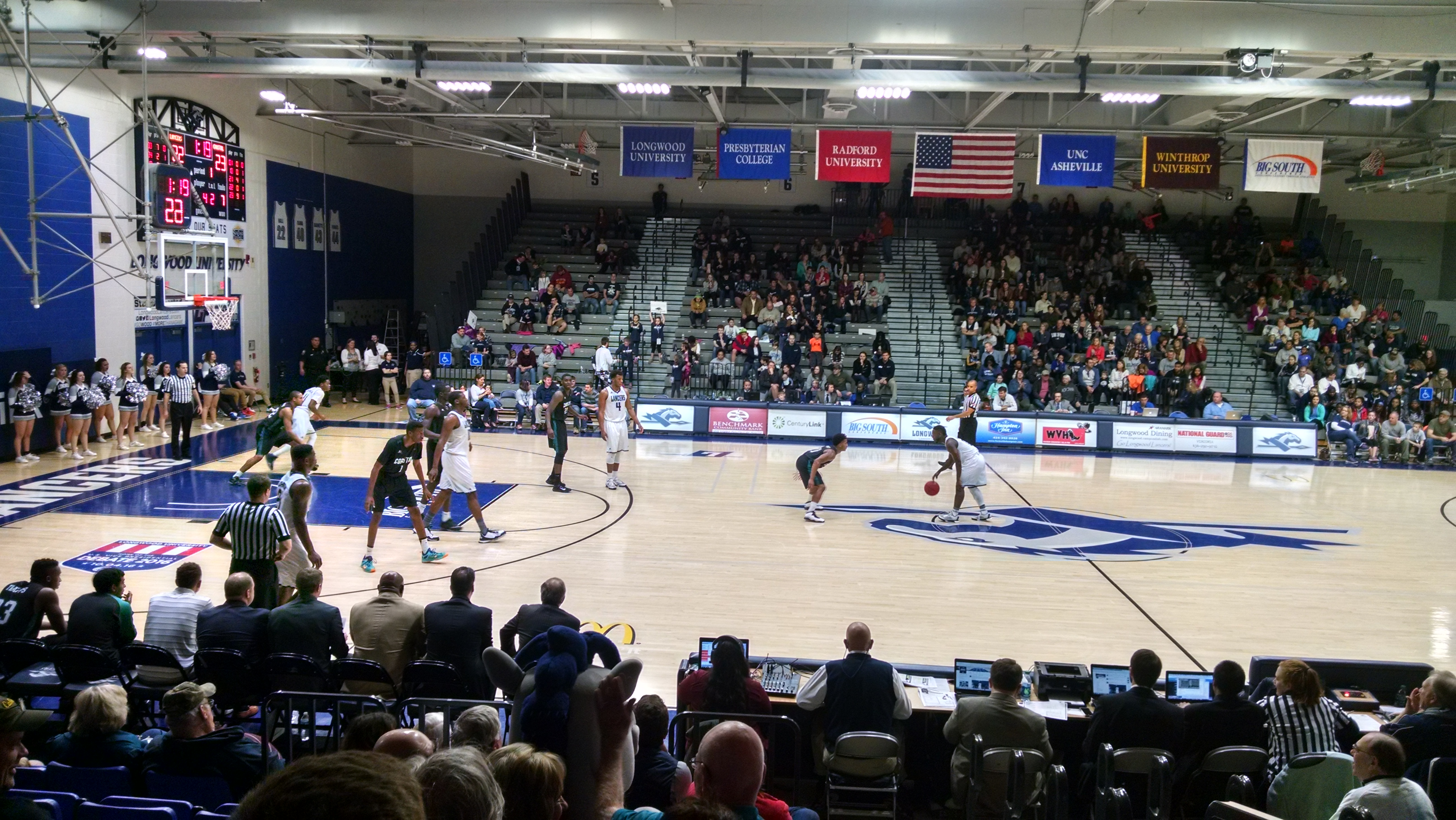
- Willett Hall in January 2016.

- Location of Willett Hall in Virginia.
- Former names: Lancer Hall (1980–2004)
- Location: Spruce Street; Farmville, Virginia 23909
- Coordinates: 37.2975°N 78.3955°W
- Owner: Longwood University
- Operator: Longwood University
- Capacity: 2,522 (prior to 2007); 1,807 (2007–2023)
- Record attendance: 2,522 (11/13/2006 vs. VCU)

Construction
- Opened: October 25, 1980
- Cost: $4.5 million ($17.6 million in 2025 dollars)
- Architects: MacIlroy & Parris (original); Little, Franck & Lohsen (facade)
- General contractor: Romeo Guest Associates

Tenants
- Longwood Lancers (1980–2023); United States vice presidential debate (2016)

Willett Hall (originally Lancer Hall) is an academic facility and previously served as a 1,807-seat multi-purpose arena in Farmville, Virginia. It was built in 1980 and was home to the Longwood University Lancers men's and women's basketball teams until 2023. On December 3, 2016, the basketball court was named after former Longwood basketball player Jerome Kersey, officially making the hardwood Jerome Kersey Court.

On October 4, 2016, Longwood was the host for the 2016 United States vice presidential debate. Willett Hall was the venue for the debate. Prior to the debate, the building underwent a modest renovation to the front entrance and lobby in preparation.

On April 10, 2019, Longwood announced a $15 million donation to begin construction of a new convocation and events center to replace Willett Hall as the venue for Lancer basketball. The arena will be named the Joan Perry Brock Center after its benefactor, cost $35-40 million, would seat 3,000, and is scheduled to open in 2023. Willett Hall will remain in use as an academic facility, and provide support to the basketball teams as a practice and training venue.

== Gallery ==
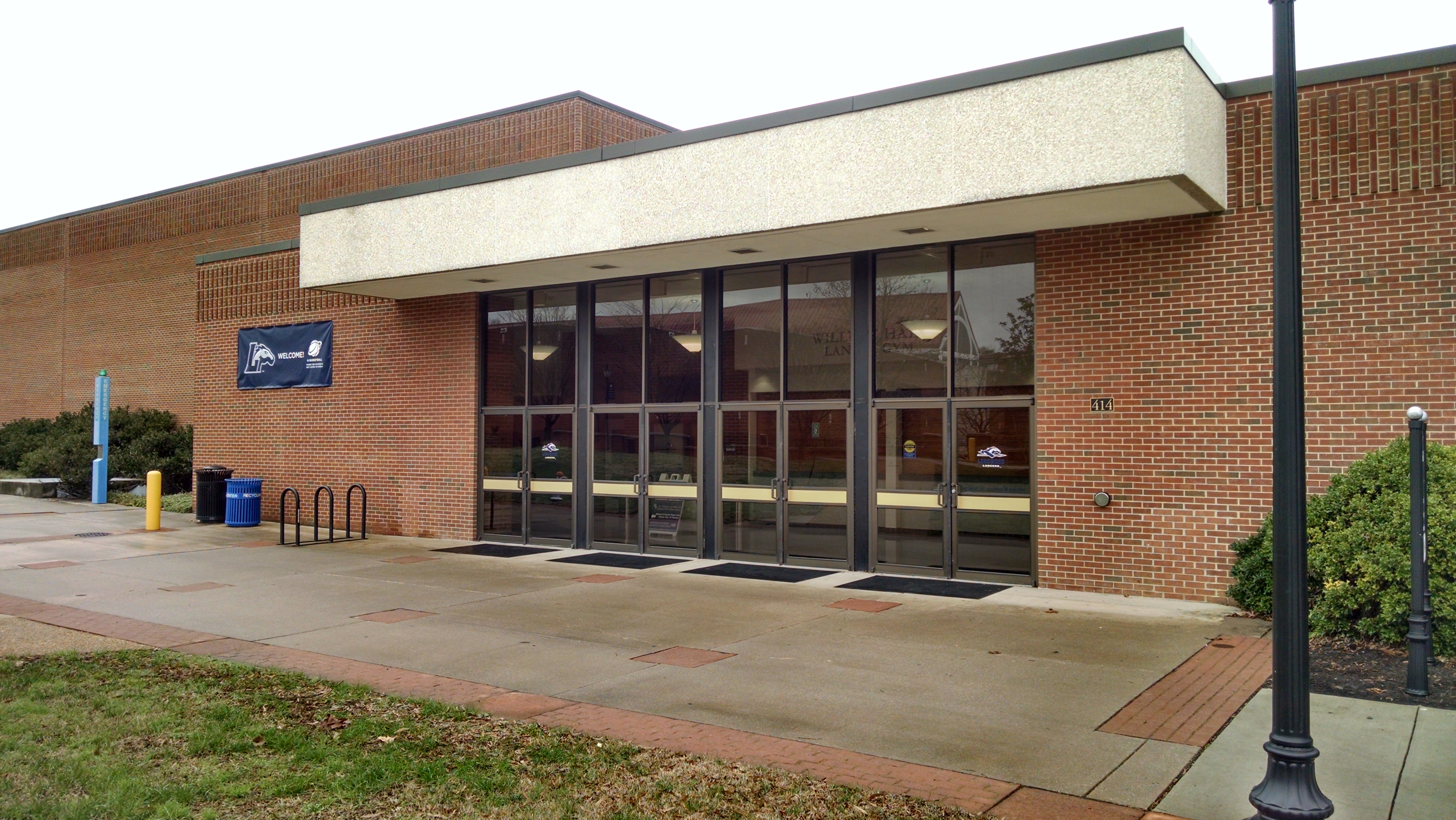
Main entrance of Willett Hall, prior to the 2016 update.

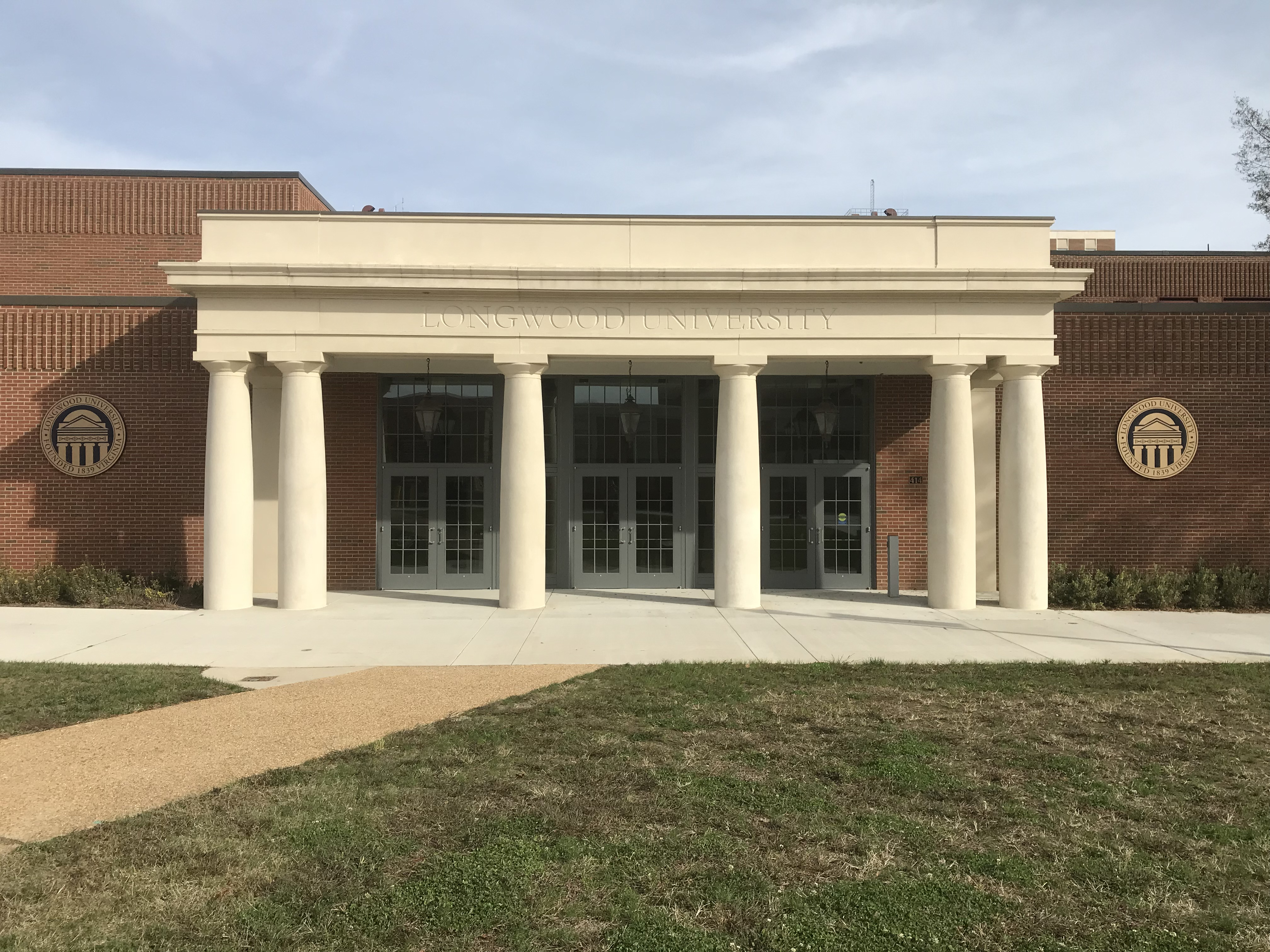
Main entrance following the renovations.

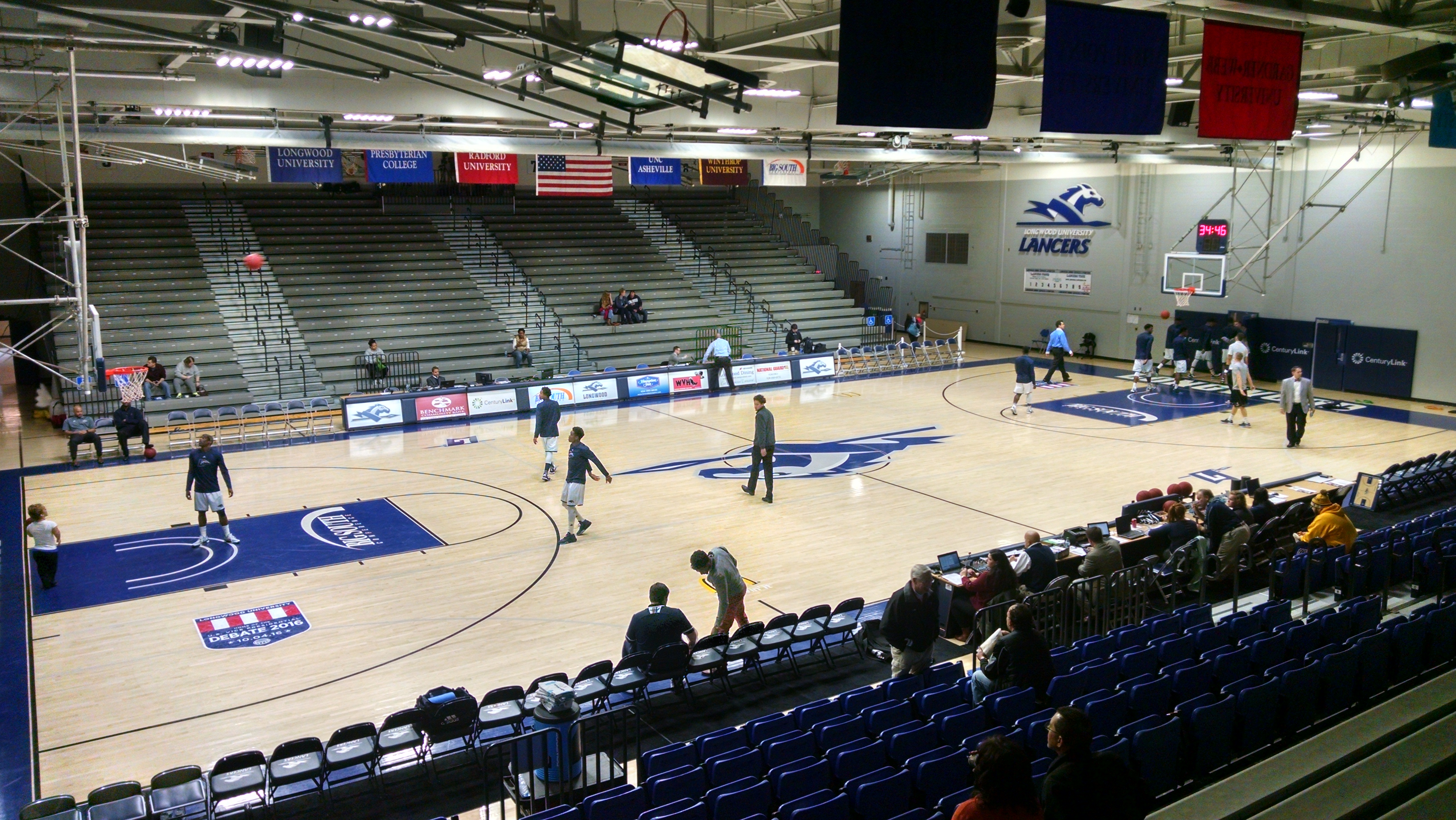
During pregame warmups.

== See also ==
- List of NCAA Division I basketball arenas
