= 2015–16 East Tennessee State Buccaneers men's basketball team =

American college basketball season

2015–16 East Tennessee State Buccaneers men's basketball
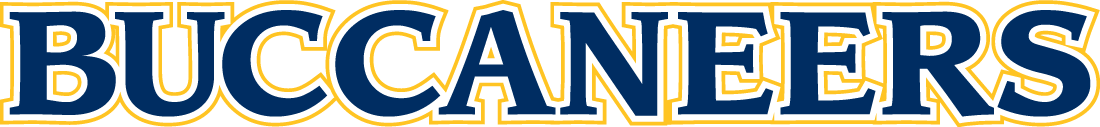

Vegas 16, Semifinals
- Conference: Southern Conference
- Record: 24–12 (14–4 SoCon)
- Head coach: Steve Forbes (1st season)
- Assistant coaches: Jason Shay; Brian Collins; Brooks Savage
- Home arena: Freedom Hall Civic Center

2015–16 Southern Conference men's basketball standings
	Conf.				Overall
Team	W		L	PCT	W		L	PCT
Chattanooga †	15	–	3	.833	29	–	6	.829
East Tennessee State	14	–	4	.778	24	–	12	.667
Furman	11	–	7	.611	19	–	16	.543
Wofford	11	–	7	.611	15	–	17	.469
Western Carolina	10	–	8	.556	16	–	18	.471
UNC Greensboro	10	–	8	.556	15	–	19	.441
Mercer	8	–	10	.444	19	–	15	.559
Samford	4	–	14	.222	14	–	19	.424
VMI	4	–	14	.222	9	–	21	.300
The Citadel	3	–	15	.167	10	–	22	.313
† 2016 SoCon Tournament winner

The 2015–16 East Tennessee State Buccaneers basketball team represented East Tennessee State University during the 2015–16 NCAA Division I men's basketball season. The Buccaneers, led by first year head coach Steve Forbes, played their home games at the Freedom Hall Civic Center and were of the Southern Conference. They finished the season 24–12, 14–4 in SoCon play to finish in to second place. They defeated Mercer and Furman to advance to the championship game of the SoCon tournament where they lost to Chattanooga. They were invited to the inaugural Vegas 16, which only had eight teams, where they defeated Louisiana Tech in the quarterfinals to advance to the semifinals where they lost to Oakland.

== Roster ==
2015–16 East Tennessee State Buccaneers men's basketball team
Players
Coaches

Pos.	#	Name	Height	Weight	Year	Hometown
F	0	T.J. Cromer	6 ft 3 in (1.91 m)	190 lb (86 kg)	Jr	Albany, Georgia
G	1	Petey McClain	6 ft 0 in (1.83 m)	185 lb (84 kg)	Sr	Mobile, Alabama
G	2	Shemar Johnson	6 ft 6 in (1.98 m)	180 lb (82 kg)	Fr	Columbus, Mississippi
G	3	Ge'Lawn Guyn	6 ft 2 in (1.88 m)	185 lb (84 kg)	Sr	Lexington, Kentucky
C	5	Peter Jurkin	7 ft 0 in (2.13 m)	230 lb (104 kg)	Jr	Juba, South Sudan
F	10	Isaac Banks	6 ft 7 in (2.01 m)	215 lb (98 kg)	Jr	New Orleans, Louisiana
G	11	Desonta Bradford	6 ft 4 in (1.93 m)	185 lb (84 kg)	So	Humboldt, Tennessee
F	12	Hanner Mosquera-Perea	6 ft 9 in (2.06 m)	225 lb (102 kg)	Sr	Istmina, Colombia
G	13	A.J. Merriweather	6 ft 2 in (1.88 m)	185 lb (84 kg)	Jr	Jackson, Tennessee
G	14	Deuce Bello	6 ft 4 in (1.93 m)	200 lb (91 kg)	Sr	Greensboro, North Carolina
F	15	Lester Wilson	6 ft 4 in (1.93 m)	215 lb (98 kg)	Sr	Knoxville, Tennessee
F	21	Nigel Holley	6 ft 8 in (2.03 m)	210 lb (95 kg)	Jr	Wilmington, North Carolina
F	24	Abednego Lufile	6 ft 7 in (2.01 m)	225 lb (102 kg)	Jr	Burlington, Ontario, Canada
G	30	Stetson Moore	6 ft 0 in (1.83 m)	155 lb (70 kg)	Jr	Knoxville, Tennessee
C	31	Toriano Stokes	6 ft 8 in (2.03 m)	230 lb (104 kg)	Fr	Memphis, Tennessee
F	40	Tevin Glass	6 ft 8 in (2.03 m)	210 lb (95 kg)	Sr	Norcross, Georgia

Head coach

- Steve Forbes

Assistant coach(es)

- Jason Shay
- Brian Collins
- Brooks Savage

Legend

- (C) Team captain
- (S) Suspended
- (I) Ineligible
- (W) Walk-on
- Injured
- Current redshirt

Roster
Last update: November 2, 2015

== Schedule ==
Date time, TV	Rank^{#}	Opponent^{#}	Result	Record	Site (attendance) city, state
Exhibition
11/05/2015*; 7:00 pm		Tusculum	W 109–77		Freedom Hall Civic Center (2,550); Johnson City, TN
Regular season
11/14/2015*; 4:00 pm		Averett	W 107–59	1–0	Freedom Hall Civic Center (2,167); Johnson City, TN
11/17/2015*; 6:00 am, ESPN		Green Bay; NIT Season Tip-Off	W 103–90	2–0	Freedom Hall Civic Center (3,992); Johnson City, TN
11/20/2015*; 7:00 pm, FS2		at No. 11 Villanova; NIT Season Tip-Off	L 51–86	2–1	The Pavilion (6,500); Villanova, PA
11/22/2015*; 2:00 pm, ESPN3		at Georgia Tech; NIT Season Tip-Off	W 69–68	3–1	Hank McCamish Pavilion (4,665); Atlanta, GA
11/24/2015*; 7:30 pm		at Charleston Southern; NIT Season Tip-Off	L 76–77	3–2	CSU Field House (905); North Charleston, SC
11/28/2015*; 4:00 pm		UNC Wilmington	L 73–94	3–3	Freedom Hall Civic Center (2,557); Johnson City, TN
12/02/2015*; 6:00 pm		at Tennessee Tech	L 61–63	3–4	Eblen Center (1,011); Cookeville, TN
12/10/2015*; 7:00 pm		Milligan	W 98–47	4–4	Freedom Hall Civic Center (2,458); Johnson City, TN
12/15/2015*; 7:00 pm		at UNC Asheville	L 64–84	4–5	Kimmel Arena (1,327); Asheville, NC
12/18/2015*; 7:00 pm		Eastern Kentucky	W 87–81	5–5	Freedom Hall Civic Center (2,453); Johnson City, TN
12/22/2015*; 7:00 pm		at Tennessee	L 67–76	5–6	Thompson–Boling Arena (14,684); Knoxville, TN
12/30/2015*; 7:00 pm		Morehead State	W 75–72	6–6	Freedom Hall Civic Center (2,650); Johnson City, TN
01/02/2016; 2:00 pm		at Western Carolina	W 82–66	7–6 (1–0)	Ramsey Center (956); Cullowhee, NC
01/04/2016*; 8:00 pm		at North Carolina Central	W 72–68	8–6	McLendon–McDougald Gymnasium (881); Durham, NC
01/09/2016; 4:00 pm, ESPN3		UNC Greensboro	W 86–83	9–6 (2–0)	Freedom Hall Civic Center (3,078); Johnson City, TN
01/11/2016; 7:00 pm, ESPN3		VMI	W 88–51	10–6 (3–0)	Freedom Hall Civic Center (2,416); Johnson City, TN
01/14/2016; 8:00 pm, ESPN3		at Samford	W 81–77	11–6 (4–0)	Pete Hanna Center (1,066); Homewood, AL
01/16/2016; 5:00 pm		at Chattanooga	L 84–94	11–7 (4–1)	McKenzie Arena (5,003); Chattanooga, TN
01/21/2016; 7:00 pm, ESPN3		Mercer	W 65–63 ^{OT}	12–7 (5–1)	Freedom Hall Civic Center (3,003); Johnson City, TN
01/23/2016; 4:00 pm, ESPN3		The Citadel	W 101–92 ^{OT}	13–7 (6–1)	Freedom Hall Civic Center (2,789); Johnson City, TN
01/28/2016; 7:00 pm		at Wofford	L 73–87	13–8 (6–2)	Benjamin Johnson Arena (1,412); Spartanburg, SC
01/30/2016; 4:00 pm, ESPN3		at Furman	L 70–74	13–9 (6–3)	Timmons Arena (2,004); Greenville, SC
02/04/2016; 7:00 pm, ESPN3		at VMI	W 71–60	14–9 (7–3)	Cameron Hall (1,178); Lexington, VA
02/04/2016; 7:00 pm		at UNC Greensboro	W 68–65	15–9 (8–3)	Fleming Gymnasium (1,902); Greensboro, NC
02/11/2016; 7:00 pm, ESPN3		Samford	W 94–90 ^{OT}	16–9 (9–3)	Freedom Hall Civic Center (2,945); Johnson City, TN
02/13/2016; 4:00 pm, FS South/ESPN3		Chattanooga	L 68–76	16–10 (9–4)	Freedom Hall Civic Center (5,601); Johnson City, TN
02/15/2016; 7:00 pm		Western Carolina	W 83–77	17–10 (10–4)	Freedom Hall Civic Center (2,752); Johnson City, TN
02/18/2016; 6:00 pm, ESPN3		at The Citadel	W 67–51	18–10 (11–4)	McAlister Field House (1,389); Charleston, SC
02/20/2016; 4:30 pm, ESPN3		at Mercer	W 77–74	19–10 (12–4)	Hawkins Arena (3,874); Macon, GA
02/25/2016; 7:00 pm, ESPN3		Furman	W 80–75	20–10 (13–4)	Freedom Hall Civic Center (3,016); Johnson City, TN
02/27/2016; 4:00 pm, ESPN3		Wofford	W 71–66	21–10 (14–4)	Freedom Hall Civic Center (4,104); Johnson City, TN
SoCon tournament
03/05/2016; 6:00 pm, ESPN3	(2)	vs. (7) Mercer; Quarterfinals	W 81–65	22–10	U.S. Cellular Center; Asheville, NC
03/06/2016; 7:30 pm, ESPN3	(2)	vs. (3) Furman; Semifinals	W 84–76	23–10	U.S. Cellular Center (6,019); Asheville, NC
03/07/2016; 9:00 pm, ESPN2	(2)	vs. (1) Chattanooga; Championship game	L 67–73	23–11	U.S. Cellular Center (3,058); Asheville, NC
Vegas 16
03/28/2016*; 9:00 pm, CBSSN		vs. Louisiana Tech; Quarterfinals	W 88–83	24–11	Mandalay Bay Events Center; Paradise, NV
03/29/2016*; 11:30 pm, CBSSN		vs. Oakland; Semifinals	L 81–104	24–12	Mandalay Bay Events Center; Paradise, NV
*Non-conference game. ^{#}Rankings from AP Poll. (#) Tournament seedings in parentheses. All times are in Eastern Time.
