= 2015–16 The Citadel Bulldogs basketball team =

American college basketball season

2015–16 The Citadel Bulldogs basketball
- Conference: Southern Conference
- Record: 10–22 (3–15 SoCon)
- Head coach: Duggar Baucom (1st season)
- Assistant coaches: Daniel Willis; Ryan Mattocks
- Home arena: McAlister Field House

2015–16 Southern Conference men's basketball standings
	Conf.				Overall
Team	W		L	PCT	W		L	PCT
Chattanooga †	15	–	3	.833	29	–	6	.829
East Tennessee State	14	–	4	.778	24	–	12	.667
Furman	11	–	7	.611	19	–	16	.543
Wofford	11	–	7	.611	15	–	17	.469
Western Carolina	10	–	8	.556	16	–	18	.471
UNC Greensboro	10	–	8	.556	15	–	19	.441
Mercer	8	–	10	.444	19	–	15	.559
Samford	4	–	14	.222	14	–	19	.424
VMI	4	–	14	.222	9	–	21	.300
The Citadel	3	–	15	.167	10	–	22	.313
† 2016 SoCon Tournament winner

The 2015–16 The Citadel Bulldogs basketball team represented The Citadel, The Military College of South Carolina in the 2015–16 NCAA Division I men's basketball season. The Bulldogs were led by first year head coach Duggar Baucom and played their home games at McAlister Field House. Baucom was previously the head coach at military rival VMI. They again played as a member of the Southern Conference, as they have since 1936–37. They finished the season 10–22, 3–15 in SoCon play to finish in last place. They lost in the first round of the SoCon tournament to Mercer.

== Preseason ==
With the hiring of Duggar Baucom as head coach, The Citadel adopted a more up-tempo style, similar to that which Baucom used at VMI. This is in stark contrast to the slow, deliberate pace employed in recent seasons by previous coach Chuck Driesell. A large turnover in personnel resulted, with several early commits deciding to go elsewhere, and several of Baucom's recruits at VMI following him to Charleston. Baucom also landed two graduate students who transferred to The Citadel to play their final year of eligibility.

The Bulldogs were picked to finish 9th in the 10 team Southern Conference by both the media and coaches.

=== Departures ===
Aside from three seniors, The Citadel also lost freshman guard Jake Wright to transfer. Coach Baucom landed two recruits, who signed National Letters of Intent on April 20, 2015.

Name	Position	Class	Reason
C. J. Bray	F	RS–Jr.	
Marshall Harris III	G	Sr.	Graduation
P. J. Horgan	C	Sr.	Graduation
Ashton Moore	G	Sr.	Graduation
Jake Wright	G	Fr.	Transfer

=== Recruiting ===
College recruiting
Name	Hometown	School	Height	Weight	Commit date
Matt Frierson; SG	Laurel, MD	Chapelgate Christian Academy	6 ft 2 in (1.88 m)	150 lb (68 kg)	
Matt Frierson; SG	Recruit ratings: (NR)				
Trevor Jain; SF	Pigeon Forge, TN	West Oaks Academy	6 ft 6 in (1.98 m)	N/A	
Trevor Jain; SF	Recruit ratings: (NR)				
Zane Najdawi; PF	Richmond, VA	Cosby High School	6 ft 7 in (2.01 m)	205 lb (93 kg)	
Zane Najdawi; PF	Recruit ratings: (NR)				
James Pado; C	Perth, Australia	West Oaks Academy	6 ft 9 in (2.06 m)	223 lb (101 kg)	
James Pado; C	Recruit ratings: (NR)				
Connor Schroeder; SF	Blacksburg, VA	Miller School	6 ft 7 in (2.01 m)	N/A	Mar 31, 2015
Connor Schroeder; SF	Recruit ratings: (NR)				
Quayson Williams; PG	Gibsonville, NC	Eastern Guilford	6 ft 1 in (1.85 m)	165 lb (75 kg)	Apr 16, 2015
Quayson Williams; PG	Recruit ratings: (NR)				
Overall recruit ranking:
Note: In many cases, Scout, Rivals, 247Sports, On3, and ESPN may conflict in their listings of height and weight.; In these cases, the average was taken. ESPN grades are on a 100-point scale.; Sources: "ESPN – Citadel Basketball Recruiting 2015". ESPN.; "2015 Team Ranking". Rivals.

== Roster ==
P. J. Boutte was dismissed from the team for a violation of team rules just prior to the Bulldogs' appearance in the first round of the Southern Conference tournament.

Number	Name	Position	Height	Weight	Year	Hometown
1	P. J. Boutte	Guard	5–9	160	Graduate	Indianapolis, Indiana
2	Quayson Williams	Guard	5–11	170	Freshman	Greensboro, North Carolina
3	Matt Frierson	Guard	6–1	150	Freshman	Marriottsville, Maryland
5	Warren Sledge	Guard	6–3	180	Junior	Keller, Texas
11	Tom Koopman	Center	6–8	210	Junior	Weert, Netherlands
13	Tim Broom	Guard	6-2	195	Sophomore	Jacksonville, Florida
14	Tommy Olds	Guard	5–10	150	Junior	Blythewood, South Carolina
15	Derrick Henry	Guard	6–3	190	Graduate	Covington, Georgia
21	Bobby Duncan	Forward	6–4	210	Senior	Fayetteville, North Carolina
22	Connor Schroeder	Forward	6–7	225	Freshman	Blacksburg, Virginia
24	Qwandell Newton	Forward	6–6	195	Freshman	Naples, Florida
32	Brian White	Forward	6–6	205	Junior	Richmond, Virginia
33	Quinton Marshall	Guard	6–5	205	Senior	Raleigh, North Carolina
35	Zane Jandawi	Forward	6–7	205	Freshman	Midlothian, Virginia
40	Garrett Mullis	Center	6–8	230	Freshman	Murrells Inlet, South Carolina

== Schedule ==
Date time, TV	Opponent	Result	Record	Site (attendance) city, state
Exhibition
November 6*; 3:00 p.m.	Erskine	W 118–73		McAlister Field House; Charleston, SC
Regular season
November 14*; 7:30 p.m., FS2	at No. 24 Butler	L 71–144	0–1	Hinkle Fieldhouse (8,440); Indianapolis, IN
November 17*; 6:00 p.m., ESPN3	Stetson	W 94–93	1–1	McAlister Field House; Charleston, SC
November 19*; 6:00 p.m., ESPN3	Mid-Atlantic Christian; Upstate Challenge	W 132–60	2–1	McAlister Field House (1,312); Charleston, SC
November 21*; 7:00 p.m.	at Presbyterian	L 79–95	2–2	Templeton Physical Education Center (810); Clinton, SC
November 25*; 7:00 p.m.	vs. Georgia Southern; Palmetto State Shootout	W 95–90	3–3	G. B. Hodge Center (420); Spartanburg, SC
November 27*; 7:00 p.m.	vs. Bob Jones; Palmetto State Shootout	W 121–81	4–2	G. B. Hodge Center (417); Spartanburg, SC
November 28*; 2:00 p.m.	at USC Upstate; Palmetto State Shootout	W 88–81	5–2	G. B. Hodge Center (354); Spartanburg, SC
December 2*; 9:00 p.m.	at Air Force	L 93–97	5–3	Clune Arena (806); Colorado Springs, CO
December 5*; 1:00 p.m., ESPN3	College of Charleston	L 74–82	5–4	McAlister Field House (2,156); Charleston, SC
December 8*; 6:00 p.m., ESPN3	Voorhees	W 89–85	6–4	McAlister Field House; Charleston, SC
December 16*; 7:30 p.m.	at Bethune-Cookman	W 99–87	7–4	Moore Gymnasium (202); Daytona Beach, FL
December 19*; 2:00 p.m., l	at Campbell	L 82–101	7–5	John W. Pope, Jr. Convocation Center (1,004); Buies Creek, NC
December 29*; 7:00 p.m.	at Charlotte	L 93–111	7–6	Dale F. Halton Arena (4,026); Charlotte, NC
January 2; 1:00 p.m., ESPN3	Chattanooga	L 78–84	7–7 (0–1)	McAlister Field House (1,332); Charleston, SC
January 5; 8:00 p.m., ESPN3	at Samford	L 74–94	7–8 (0–2)	Pete Hanna Center (834); Homewood, AL
January 9; 11:00 a.m., ESPN3	Mercer	L 80–91	7–9 (0–3)	McAlister Field House; Charleston, SC
January 14; 6:00 p.m., ESPN3	Wofford	L 83–86	7–10 (0–4)	McAlister Field House (1,481); Charleston, SC
January 16; 1:00 p.m., ESPN3	Furman; Rivalry	W 89–86	8–10 (1–4)	McAlister Field House (1,401); Charleston, SC
January 21; 7:00 p.m., SDN	at Western Carolina	W 92–91	9–10 (2–4)	Ramsey Center (1,638); Cullowhee, NC
January 23; 4:00 p.m., ESPN3	at East Tennessee State	L 92–101 ^{OT}	9–11 (2–5)	Freedom Hall Civic Center (2,789); Johnson City, TN
January 28; 6:00 p.m., ESPN3	at UNC Greensboro	L 95–102	9–12 (2–6)	McAlister Field House (1,277); Charleston, SC
January 30; 1:00 p.m., ESPN3	VMI; Rivalry	W 78–75	10–12 (3–6)	McAlister Field House (3,535); Charleston, SC
February 1; 7:00 p.m., SDN	at Chattanooga	L 85–125	10–13 (3–7)	McKenzie Arena (2,587); Chattanooga, TN
February 6; 4:30 p.m., ESPN3	at Mercer	L 72–88	10–14 (3–8)	Hawkins Arena (4,772); Macon, GA
February 8; 6:00 p.m., ESPN3	Samford	L 86–95	10–15 (3–9)	McAlister Field House (1,742); Charleston, SC
February 11; 7:00 p.m., ESPN3	at Furman; Rivalry	L 75–95	10–16 (3–10)	Timmons Arena (1,606); Greenville, SC
February 13; 7:00 p.m., ESPN3	at Wofford	L 89–99	10–17 (3–11)	Benjamin Johnson Arena (2,430); Spartanburg, SC
February 18; 6:00 p.m., ESPN3	East Tennessee State	L 51–67	10–18 (3–12)	McAlister Field House (1,389); Charleston, SC
February 20; 1:00 p.m., ESPN3	Western Carolina	L 97–102	10–19 (3–13)	McAlister Field House (4,424); Charleston, SC
February 25; 7:00 p.m., ESPN3	at UNC Greensboro	L 63–92	10–20 (3–14)	Greensboro Coliseum (3,109); Greensboro, NC
February 27; 1:00 p.m., ESPN3	at VMI; Rivalry	L 95–111	10–21 (3–15)	Cameron Hall (3,327); Lexington, VA
SoCon Tournament
March 4; 7:30 p.m., ESPN3	vs. Mercer; First round	L 69–71	10–22	U.S. Cellular Center (2,411); Asheville, NC
*Non-conference game. (#) Tournament seedings in parentheses. All times are in Eastern Time.
