= 2015–16 UNC Greensboro Spartans men's basketball team =

American college basketball season

2015–16 UNC Greensboro Spartans men's basketball

CBI, Quarterfinals
- Conference: Southern Conference
- Record: 15–19 (10–8 SoCon)
- Head coach: Wes Miller (5th season)
- Assistant coaches: Mike Roberts; Jackie Manuel; Chris Parsons
- Home arena: Greensboro Coliseum; Fleming Gymnasium

2015–16 Southern Conference men's basketball standings
	Conf.				Overall
Team	W		L	PCT	W		L	PCT
Chattanooga †	15	–	3	.833	29	–	6	.829
East Tennessee State	14	–	4	.778	24	–	12	.667
Furman	11	–	7	.611	19	–	16	.543
Wofford	11	–	7	.611	15	–	17	.469
Western Carolina	10	–	8	.556	16	–	18	.471
UNC Greensboro	10	–	8	.556	15	–	19	.441
Mercer	8	–	10	.444	19	–	15	.559
Samford	4	–	14	.222	14	–	19	.424
VMI	4	–	14	.222	9	–	21	.300
The Citadel	3	–	15	.167	10	–	22	.313
† 2016 SoCon Tournament winner

The 2015–16 UNC Greensboro Spartans men's basketball team represented the University of North Carolina at Greensboro during the 2015–16 NCAA Division I men's basketball season. The Spartans, led by fifth year head coach Wes Miller, play their home games at the Greensboro Coliseum, with two home games at Fleming Gymnasium, and are members of the Southern Conference. They finished the season 15–19, 10–8 in SoCon play to finish in a tie for fifth place. They lost in the quarterfinals of the SoCon tournament to Furman. They were invited to the College Basketball Invitational where they defeated Houston Baptist in the first round before losing in the quarterfinals to Ohio.

== Roster ==
Number	Name	Position	Height	Weight	Year	Hometown
1	Marvin Smith	Guard/Forward	6–6	190	Sophomore	Richmond, Virginia
2	Asad Lamot	Guard	6–1	185	RS–Senior	Mebane, North Carolina
3	Jelani Mofford	Forward	6–5	192	Freshman	Mississauga, Ontario, Canada
4	Taqqi Muhammad	Guard	6–4	193	Freshman	Richmond, Virginia
10	Francis Alonso	Guard	6–3	185	Freshman	Málaga, Spain
11	Demetrius Troy	Guard	6–0	187	Freshman	Raleigh, North Carolina
12	Justin Jordan	Guard	6–3	170	Sophomore	Davidson, North Carolina
13	Kayel Locke	Forward	6–5	240	Senior	Baltimore, Maryland
14	Michael Adams	Guard	6–2	202	Senior	Raleigh, North Carolina
15	Garrett Collins	Guard	6–5	185	Sophomore	Asheville, North Carolina
20	Diante Baldwin	Guard	6–0	181	Junior	Greensboro, North Carolina
21	James Dickey	Forward	6–9	190	Freshman	Raleigh, North Carolina
25	Lloyd Burgess	Center	6–11	270	RS–Freshman	Durham, North Carolina
30	Clay Byrd	Guard	6–0	176	Junior	Connelly Springs, North Carolina
32	Jordy Kuiper	Forward	6–9	250	Junior	Groningen, Netherlands
33	R.J. White	Center	6–8	280	RS–Junior	Frisco, Texas

== Schedule ==
Date time, TV	Opponent	Result	Record	Site (attendance) city, state
Regular season
11/14/2015*; 5:00 pm	Greensboro College	W 86–69	1–0	Fleming Gymnasium (1,211); Greensboro, NC
11/17/2015*; 7:00 pm	Chowan; Spartan Showcase	W 81–60	2–0	Greensboro Coliseum (1,517); Greensboro, NC
11/21/2015*; 7:00 pm, ESPN3	at UCF	L 54–65	2–1	CFE Arena (3,607); Orlando, FL
11/27/2015*; 7:00 pm	Navy; Spartan Showcase	L 66–70	2–2	Greensboro Coliseum (1,383); Greensboro, NC
11/28/2015*; 7:00 pm	IPFW; Spartan Showcase	L 58–64	2–3	Greensboro Coliseum (1,389); Greensboro, NC
11/29/2015*; 3:00 pm	Jacksonville; Spartan Showcase	W 71–69	3–3	Greensboro Coliseum (1,349); Greensboro, NC
12/02/2015*; 7:00 pm	at North Carolina A&T; Battle of Market Street	L 68–77	3–4	Corbett Sports Center (1,832); Greensboro, NC
12/09/2015*; 7:00 pm	at High Point	L 72–90	3–5	Millis Center (1,750); High Point, NC
12/12/2015*; 8:00 pm	Belmont Abbey	W 84–61	4–5	Greensboro Coliseum (1,836); Greensboro, NC
12/15/2015*; 7:00 pm, ESPN3	at Wake Forest	L 71–81	4–6	LJVM Coliseum (7,249); Winston-Salem, NC
12/19/2015*; 1:00 pm, ESPN3	at Elon	L 69–79	4–7	Alumni Gym (1,000); Elon, NC
12/22/2015*; 7:00 pm, ESPN3	at NC State	L 52–58	4–8	PNC Arena (15,716); Raleigh, NC
12/28/2015*; 7:00 pm, ESPNU	at No. 7 North Carolina	L 63–96	4–9	Dean Smith Center (19,246); Chapel Hill, NC
01/02/2016; 7:00 pm	at Wofford	L 76–87	4–10 (0–1)	Benjamin Johnson Arena (1,080); Spartanburg, SC
01/05/2016; 4:00 pm	Furman	W 67–66	5–10 (1–1)	Greensboro Coliseum (1,638); Greensboro, NC
01/09/2016; 4:00 pm, ESPN3	at East Tennessee State	L 83–86	5–11 (1–2)	Freedom Hall Civic Center (3,078); Johnson City, TN
01/11/2016; 7:00 pm, ASN	at Western Carolina	L 77–83 ^{OT}	5–12 (1–3)	Ramsey Center (1,497); Cullowhee, NC
01/17/2016; 1:00 pm, ESPN3	VMI	W 85–68	6–12 (2–3)	Greensboro Coliseum (1,381); Greensboro, NC
01/21/2016; 7:00 pm, ESPN3	Chattanooga	L 60–73	6–13 (2–4)	Greensboro Coliseum (1,718); Greensboro, NC
01/24/2016; 1:00 pm, ESPN3	Samford; Postponed from 1/23/16	W 86–78	7–13 (3–4)	Greensboro Coliseum (1,755); Greensboro, NC
01/28/2016; 6:00 pm, ESPN3	at The Citadel	W 102–95	8–13 (4–4)	McAlister Field House (1,277); Charleston, SC
01/30/2016; 4:30 pm, ESPN3	at Mercer	L 67–81	8–14 (4–5)	Hawkins Arena (4,032); Macon, GA
02/04/2016; 7:00 pm, ESPN3	Western Carolina	W 75–58	9–14 (5–5)	Greensboro Coliseum (2,593); Greensboro, NC
02/06/2016; 5:00 pm	East Tennessee State	L 65–68	9–15 (5–6)	Fleming Gymnasium (1,902); Greensboro, NC
02/08/2016; 7:00 pm	at Furman	L 72–79	9–16 (5–7)	Timmons Arena (1,110); Greenville, SC
02/11/2016; 7:00 pm, ESPN3	at VMI	L 72–86	9–17 (5–8)	Cameron Hall (1,134); Lexington, VA
02/15/2016; 7:00 pm, ESPN3	Wofford	W 65–61	10–17 (6–8)	Greensboro Coliseum (2,035); Greensboro, NC
02/18/2016; 8:00 pm, ESPN3	at Samford	W 82–77 ^{OT}	11–17 (7–8)	Pete Hanna Center (1,021); Homewood, AL
02/20/2016; 7:00 pm	at Chattanooga	L 64–79	12–17 (8–8)	McKenzie Arena (5,718); Chattanooga, TN
02/25/2016; 7:00 pm, ESPN3	The Citadel	W 92–63	13–17 (9–8)	Greensboro Coliseum (3,109); Greensboro, NC
02/28/2016; 1:00 pm, ESPN3	Mercer	W 69–65	14–17 (10–8)	Greensboro Coliseum (3,156); Greensboro, NC
SoCon tournament
03/05/2016; 8:30 pm, ESPN3	vs. Furman; Quarterfinals	L 64–80	14–18	U.S. Cellular Center (5,164); Asheville, NC
CBI
03/16/2016*; 7:00 pm	Houston Baptist; First round	W 69–65	15–18	Greensboro Coliseum (1,031); Greensboro, NC
03/21/2016*; 7:00 pm	at Ohio; Quarterfinals	L 67–72	15–19	Convocation Center (3,567); Athens, OH
*Non-conference game. ^{#}Rankings from AP Poll. (#) Tournament seedings in parentheses. All times are in Eastern Time.
