= 2015–16 Western Carolina Catamounts men's basketball team =

American college basketball season

2015–16 Western Carolina Catamounts men's basketball
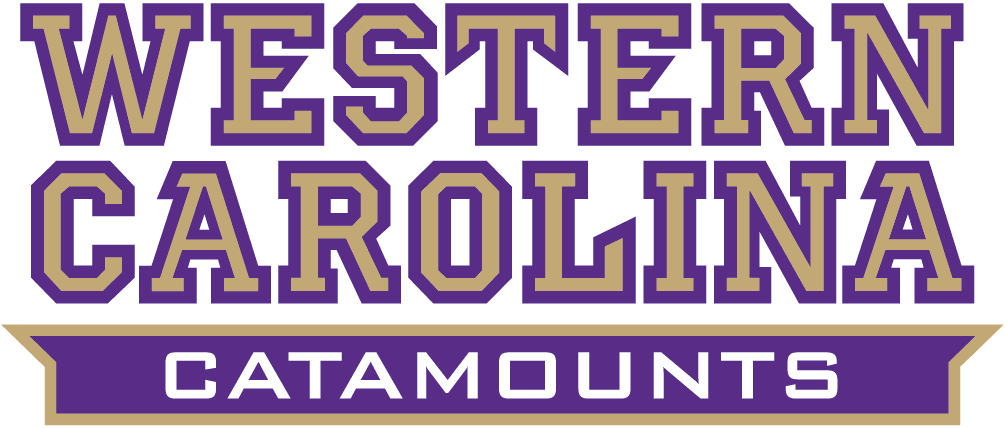

CBI, First round
- Conference: Southern Conference
- Record: 16–18 (10–8 SoCon)
- Head coach: Larry Hunter (11th season)
- Assistant coaches: Anquell McCollum; Brigham Waginger; Wilie Freeman
- Home arena: Ramsey Center

2015–16 Southern Conference men's basketball standings
| | Conf. | | | | Overall |
| Team | W | | L | PCT | W | | L | PCT |
|---|---|---|---|---|---|---|---|---|
| Chattanooga † | 15 | – | 3 | .833 | 29 | – | 6 | .829 |
| East Tennessee State | 14 | – | 4 | .778 | 24 | – | 12 | .667 |
| Furman | 11 | – | 7 | .611 | 19 | – | 16 | .543 |
| Wofford | 11 | – | 7 | .611 | 15 | – | 17 | .469 |
| Western Carolina | 10 | – | 8 | .556 | 16 | – | 18 | .471 |
| UNC Greensboro | 10 | – | 8 | .556 | 15 | – | 19 | .441 |
| Mercer | 8 | – | 10 | .444 | 19 | – | 15 | .559 |
| Samford | 4 | – | 14 | .222 | 14 | – | 19 | .424 |
| VMI | 4 | – | 14 | .222 | 9 | – | 21 | .300 |
| The Citadel | 3 | – | 15 | .167 | 10 | – | 22 | .313 |
† 2016 SoCon Tournament winner

The 2015–16 Western Carolina Catamounts men's basketball team represented Western Carolina University during the 2015–16 NCAA Division I men's basketball season. The Catamounts, led by 11th year head coach Larry Hunter, played their home games at the Ramsey Center and were members of the Southern Conference. They finished the season 16–18, 10–8 in SoCon play to finish in a tie for fifth place. They defeated Wofford to advance to the semifinals of the SoCon tournament where they lost to Chattanooga. They were invited to the College Basketball Invitational where they lost in the first round to Vermont.

== Roster ==
| Number | Name | Position | Height | Weight | Year | Hometown |
|---|---|---|---|---|---|---|
| 1 | Elijah Pughsley | Guard | 6–1 | 175 | Freshman | Lima, Ohio |
| 2 | Mike Brown | Guard | 6–3 | 175 | Senior | Charlotte, North Carolina |
| 3 | Rhett Harrelson | Guard | 5–10 | 170 | Senior | Enterprise, Alabama |
| 4 | Torrion Brummitt | Forward | 6–7 | 240 | Senior | Columbus, Georgia |
| 5 | Devin Peterson | Guard | 6–1 | 170 | Sophomore | Milton, Georgia |
| 11 | Haboubacar Mutombo | Guard | 6–5 | 190 | Sophomore | Pickering, Ontario, Canada |
| 12 | Marc Gosselin | Forward | 6–7 | 195 | Freshman | Lyon, France |
| 13 | Deriece Parks | Guard | 6–5 | 155 | Junior | Charlotte, North Carolina |
| 21 | Kyle Rhoades | Forward | 6–6 | 190 | Junior | Lumberton, North Carolina |
| 22 | Jesse Deloach | Forward | 6–7 | 225 | Freshman | Grayson, Georgia |
| 23 | Justin Browning | Forward | 6–4 | 175 | Senior | Sylacauga, Alabama |
| 24 | Ashley Williams | Forward | 6–5 | 170 | Sophomore | Morehead City, North Carolina |
| 31 | Aaron Williams | Guard | 6–3 | 190 | Sophomore | Morehead City, North Carolina |
| 41 | Charlendez Brooks | Forward | 6–9 | 250 | RS–Sophomore | Duncan, South Carolina |

== Schedule ==
| Date time, TV | Opponent | Result | Record | Site (attendance) city, state |
Regular season
| 11/13/2015*; 7:00 pm, ESPN3 | at Cincinnati | L 72–97 | 0–1 | Fifth Third Arena (7,213); Cincinnati, OH |
| 11/15/2015*; 4:30 pm | UNC Asheville | W 90–81 | 1–1 | Ramsey Center (1,113); Cullowhee, NC |
| 11/21/2015*; 7:00 pm | at High Point | L 69–75 | 1–2 | Millis Center (1,750); High Point, NC |
| 11/24/2015*; 7:30 pm | Hiwassee | W 88–63 | 2–2 | Ramsey Center (1,398); Cullowhee, NC |
| 11/27/2015*; 3:00 pm | at College of Charleston | L 56–57 | 2–3 | TD Arena (2,002); Charleston, SC |
| 11/30/2015*; 7:00 pm, SECN | at South Carolina | L 53–76 | 2–4 | Colonial Life Arena (8,957); Columbia, SC |
| 12/03/2015*; 7:00 pm | Warren Wilson | W 96–45 | 3–4 | Ramsey Center (1,233); Cullowhee, NC |
| 12/05/2015*; 3:00 pm, ESPN3 | at Illinois | L 68–80 | 3–5 | State Farm Center (11,455); Champaign, IL |
| 12/12/2015*; 7:00 pm | at Davidson; Gotham Classic | L 54–87 | 3–6 | John M. Belk Arena (4,068); Davidson, NC |
| 12/14/2015*; 7:00 pm | Eastern Washington; Gotham Classic | W 97–80 | 4–6 | Ramsey Center (858); Cullowhee, NC |
| 12/20/2015*; 4:00 pm | at Morehead State; Gotham Classic | L 52–60 | 4–7 | Ellis Johnson Arena (2,153); Morehead, KY |
| 12/23/2015*; 7:00 pm, ROOT | at Pittsburgh; Gotham Classic | L 73–79 | 4–8 | Petersen Events Center (8,025); Pittsburgh, PA |
| 12/30/2015*; 2:00 pm | Mars Hill | W 82–62 | 5–8 | Ramsey Center (946); Cullowhee, NC |
| 01/02/2016; 2:00 pm | East Tennessee State | L 66–82 | 5–9 (0–1) | Ramsey Center (956); Cullowhee, NC |
| 01/09/2016; 4:30 pm | VMI | W 73–52 | 6–9 (1–1) | Ramsey Center (1,844); Cullowhee, NC |
| 01/11/2016; 7:00 pm, ASN | UNC Greensboro | W 83–77 ^{OT} | 7–9 (2–1) | Ramsey Center (1,497); Cullowhee, NC |
| 01/14/2016; 7:30 pm | at Chattanooga | L 58–77 | 7–10 (2–2) | McKenzie Arena (2,523); Chattanooga, TN |
| 01/16/2016; 7:00 pm, ESPN3 | at Samford | L 68–84 | 7–11 (2–3) | Pete Hanna Center (1,781); Homewood, AL |
| 01/21/2016; 7:30 pm | The Citadel | L 91–92 | 7–12 (2–4) | Ramsey Center (1,638); Cullowhee, NC |
| 01/24/2016; 1:00 pm | Mercer; Postponed from 1/23/16 | W 86–80 ^{2OT} | 8–12 (3–4) | Ramsey Center (1,112); Cullowhee, NC |
| 01/28/2016; 7:00 pm, ESPN3 | at Furman | L 60–62 | 8–13 (3–5) | Timmons Arena (1,748); Greenville, SC |
| 01/30/2016; 7:00 pm | at Wofford | L 66–85 | 8–14 (3–6) | Benjamin Johnson Arena (2,070); Spartanburg, SC |
| 02/04/2016; 7:00 pm, ESPN3 | at UNC Greensboro | L 58–75 | 8–15 (3–7) | Greensboro Coliseum (2,593); Greensboro, NC |
| 02/06/2016; 1:00 pm, ESPN3 | at VMI | W 69–60 | 9–15 (4–7) | Cameron Hall (2,379); Lexington, VA |
| 02/11/2016; 7:30 pm | Chattanooga | W 67–61 | 10–15 (5–7) | Ramsey Center (1,982); Cullowhee, NC |
| 02/13/2016; 4:30 pm | Samford | W 76–71 | 11–15 (6–7) | Ramsey Center (2,531); Cullowhee, NC |
| 02/15/2016; 7:00 pm, ASN | at East Tennessee State | L 77–83 | 11–16 (6–8) | Freedom Hall Civic Center (2,752); Johnson City, TN |
| 02/18/2016; 7:00 pm, ESPN3 | at Mercer | W 72–65 | 12–16 (7–8) | Hawkins Arena (3,627); Macon, GA |
| 02/20/2016; 1:00 pm, ESPN3 | at The Citadel | W 102–97 | 13–16 (8–8) | McAlister Field House (4,424); Charleston, SC |
| 02/25/2016; 7:00 pm | Wofford | W 53–48 | 14–16 (9–8) | Ramsey Center (1,112); Cullowhee, NC |
| 02/27/2016; 4:30 pm | Furman | W 73–62 | 15–16 (10–8) | Ramsey Center (1,810); Cullowhee, NC |
SoCon tournament
| 03/05/2016; 2:30 pm, ESPN3 | vs. Wofford; Quarterfinals | W 88–83 ^{2OT} | 16–16 | U.S. Cellular Center (5,667); Asheville, NC |
| 03/06/2016; 5:00 pm, ESPN3 | vs. Chattanooga; Semifinals | L 69–73 | 16–17 | U.S. Cellular Center (6,019); Asheville, NC |
CBI
| 03/16/2016*; 7:00 pm | at Vermont; First round | L 74–79 | 16–18 | Patrick Gym (1,486); Burlington, VT |
*Non-conference game. ^{#}Rankings from AP Poll. (#) Tournament seedings in parentheses. All times are in Eastern Time.
