= 2015–16 Chattanooga Mocs men's basketball team =

American college basketball season

2015–16 Chattanooga Mocs men's basketball

SoCon regular season and tournament champions

NCAA tournament, First Round
- Conference: Southern Conference
- Record: 29–6 (15–3 SoCon)
- Head coach: Matt McCall (1st season)
- Assistant coaches: Jesse Bopp; Peter Gash; Reggie Witherspoon
- Home arena: McKenzie Arena

2015–16 Southern Conference men's basketball standings
	Conf.				Overall
Team	W		L	PCT	W		L	PCT
Chattanooga †	15	–	3	.833	29	–	6	.829
East Tennessee State	14	–	4	.778	24	–	12	.667
Furman	11	–	7	.611	19	–	16	.543
Wofford	11	–	7	.611	15	–	17	.469
Western Carolina	10	–	8	.556	16	–	18	.471
UNC Greensboro	10	–	8	.556	15	–	19	.441
Mercer	8	–	10	.444	19	–	15	.559
Samford	4	–	14	.222	14	–	19	.424
VMI	4	–	14	.222	9	–	21	.300
The Citadel	3	–	15	.167	10	–	22	.313
† 2016 SoCon Tournament winner

The 2015–16 Chattanooga Mocs basketball team represented the University of Tennessee at Chattanooga during the 2015–16 NCAA Division I men's basketball season. The Mocs, led by first year head coach Matt McCall, played their home games at the McKenzie Arena and were members of the Southern Conference. They finished the season 29–6, 15–3 in SoCon play to win the SoCon regular season championship. They defeated Samford, Western Carolina, and East Tennessee State to be champions of the SoCon tournament. They received the conference's automatic bid to the NCAA tournament where they lost in the first round to Indiana. In March 2016, McCall was named SoCon Coach of the Year.

== Roster ==
Number	Name	Position	Height	Weight	Year	Hometown
0	Chuck Ester	Forward	6–7	218	Junior	Geismar, Louisiana
1	Greg Pryor	Guard	6–2	195	Junior	Memphis, Tennessee
2	Dee Oldham	Guard	6–4	208	Senior	Nashville, Tennessee
3	ZaQwaun Matthews	Guard	6–4	171	Freshman	Charlotte, North Carolina
4	Johnathan Burroughs-Cook	Guard	6–2	177	Junior	Memphis, Tennessee
5	Justin Tuoyo	Forward	6–10	235	Junior	Fayetteville, Georgia
10	Peyton Woods	Guard	6–3	167	Freshman	Monticello, Kentucky
12	K.J. Bates	Guard	6–1	180	Sophomore	Memphis, Tennessee
14	Alex Bran	Guard	6–1	182	Senior	Memphis, Tennessee
15	Eric Robertson	Guard	6–4	200	Senior	Huntsville, Alabama
20	Duke Ethridge	Forward	6–6	225	Senior	Lakeland, Georgia
23	Tre McLean	Forward	6–5	205	Junior	Charleston, South Carolina
24	Casey Jones	Guard	6–5	205	Senior	New Orleans, Louisiana
34	Jackson White	Forward	6–9	212	Freshman	Richmond, Virginia
42	Rich Kalina	Center	7–0	252	Freshman	Acworth, Georgia

== Schedule ==
Date time, TV	Rank^{#}	Opponent^{#}	Result	Record	Site (attendance) city, state
Exhibition
11/06/2015*; 7:00 pm		Covenant	W 91–63		McKenzie Arena (2,332); Chattanooga, TN
Regular season
11/13/2015*; 7:00 pm, SECN		at Georgia	W 92–90 ^{OT}	1–0	Stegeman Coliseum (5,925); Athens, GA
11/16/2015*; 7:00 pm		Hiwassee	W 94–55	2–0	McKenzie Arena (3,241); Chattanooga, TN
11/21/2015*; 8:30 pm, BTN		at Illinois; Emerald Coast Classic	W 81–77	3–0	Prairie Capital Convention Center (5,653); Springfield, IL
11/23/2015*; 8:00 pm		at No. 4 Iowa State; Emerald Coast Classic	L 63-83	3–1	Hilton Coliseum (13,305); Ames, IA
11/27/2015*; 12:00 pm		vs. Alabama State; Emerald Coast Classic	W 95–58	4–1	Northwest Florida State College (250); Niceville, FL
11/28/2015*; 1:00 pm		vs. Jacksonville State; Emerald Coast Classic	W 62–52	5–1	Northwest Florida State College (250); Niceville, FL
11/30/2015*; 8:00 pm		at Louisiana–Monroe	L 54–64	5–2	Fant–Ewing Coliseum (1,072); Monroe, LA
12/08/2015*; 7:00 pm		Tennessee Wesleyan	W 91–63	6–2	McKenzie Arena (2,153); Chattanooga, TN
12/12/2015*; 7:00 pm		at Dayton	W 61–59	7–2	UD Arena (12,425); Dayton, OH
12/15/2015*; 7:00 pm		Tennessee Tech	W 80–69	8–2	McKenzie Arena (2,500); Chattanooga, TN
12/18/2015*; 7:00 pm		Kennesaw State	W 78–66	9–2	McKenzie Arena (2,421); Chattanooga, TN
12/22/2015*; 3:00 pm		Radford	W 77–75	10–2	McKenzie Arena (2,522); Chattanooga, TN
12/29/2015*; 7:30 pm		at Lipscomb	W 80–56	11–2	Allen Arena (1,392); Nashville, TN
01/02/2016; 1:00 pm, ESPN3		at The Citadel	W 84–78	12–2 (1–0)	McAlister Field House (1,332); Charleston, SC
01/05/2016; 7:00 pm		Mercer	W 74–62	13–2 (2–0)	McKenzie Arena (3,361); Chattanooga, TN
01/09/2016; 4:00 pm, ESPN3		at Furman	L 55–70	13–3 (2–1)	Timmons Arena (1,651); Greenville, SC
01/11/2016; 7:00 pm, ESPN3		at Wofford	W 77–68	14–3 (3–1)	Benjamin Johnson Arena (1,108); Spartanburg, SC
01/14/2016; 7:00 pm		Western Carolina	W 77–58	15–3 (4–1)	McKenzie Arena (2,523); Chattanooga, TN
01/16/2016; 5:00 pm		East Tennessee State	W 94–84	16–3 (5–1)	McKenzie Arena (5,003); Chattanooga, TN
01/21/2016; 7:00 pm, ESPN3		at UNC Greensboro	W 73–60	17–3 (6–1)	Greensboro Coliseum (1,718); Greensboro, NC
01/30/2016; 7:00 pm, ESPN3		at Samford	W 63–56	18–3 (7–1)	Pete Hanna Center (2,549); Homewood, AL
02/01/2016; 7:00 pm		The Citadel	W 125–85	19–3 (8–1)	McKenzie Arena (2,587); Chattanooga, TN
02/04/2016; 7:30 pm		Wofford	W 79–63	20–3 (9–1)	McKenzie Arena (3,340); Chattanooga, TN
02/06/2016; 5:00 pm		Furman	W 62–54	21–3 (10–1)	McKenzie Arena (4,894); Chattanooga, TN
02/08/2016; 7:00 pm, ESPN3		at Mercer	W 72–66	22–3 (11–1)	Hawkins Arena; Macon, GA
02/11/2016; 7:30 pm, ESPN3		at Western Carolina	L 61–67	22–4 (11–2)	Ramsey Center; Cullowhee, NC
02/13/2016; 4:00 pm, ESPN3		at East Tennessee State	W 76–68	23–4 (12–2)	Freedom Hall Civic Center; Johnson City, TN
02/18/2016; 7:00 pm		VMI	W 85–59	24–4 (13–2)	McKenzie Arena; Chattanooga, TN
02/20/2016; 5:00 pm		UNC Greensboro	L 64–79	24–5 (13–3)	McKenzie Arena (5,718); Chattanooga, TN
02/27/2016; 5:00 pm, ESPN3		Samford	W 77–66	25–5 (14–3)	McKenzie Arena (5,564); Chattanooga, TN
02/29/2016; 7:00 pm, ESPN3		at VMI; Postponed from 1/23/16	W 67–65	26–5 (15–3)	Cameron Hall (1,211); Lexington, VA
SoCon tournament
03/05/2016; 12:00 pm, ESPN3	(1)	vs. (8) Samford; Quarterfinals	W 59–54	27–5	U.S. Cellular Center (5,667); Asheville, NC
03/06/2016; 5:00 pm, ESPN3	(1)	vs. (5) Western Carolina; Semifinals	W 73–69	28–5	U.S. Cellular Center (6,019); Asheville, NC
03/07/2016; 9:00 pm, ESPN2	(1)	vs. (2) East Tennessee State; Championship	W 73–67	29–5	U.S. Cellular Center (3,058); Asheville, NC
NCAA tournament
03/17/2016*; 7:10 pm, CBS	(12 E)	vs. (5 E) No. 14 Indiana; First Round	L 74–99	29–6	Wells Fargo Arena (16,774); Des Moines, IA
*Non-conference game. ^{#}Rankings from AP Poll. (#) Tournament seedings in parentheses. E=East Region. All times are in Eastern Time.

== See also ==
- 2015-16 Chattanooga Mocs women's basketball
