= 2015–16 Mercer Bears men's basketball team =

American college basketball season

2015–16 Mercer Bears men's basketball

Challenge in Music City Champions

CIT, First round
- Conference: Southern Conference
- Record: 19–15 (8–10 SoCon)
- Head coach: Bob Hoffman (8th season)
- Assistant coaches: Doug Esleeck; Jarred Merrill; Jason Eaker
- Home arena: Hawkins Arena

2015–16 Southern Conference men's basketball standings
| | Conf. | | | | Overall |
| Team | W | | L | PCT | W | | L | PCT |
|---|---|---|---|---|---|---|---|---|
| Chattanooga † | 15 | – | 3 | .833 | 29 | – | 6 | .829 |
| East Tennessee State | 14 | – | 4 | .778 | 24 | – | 12 | .667 |
| Furman | 11 | – | 7 | .611 | 19 | – | 16 | .543 |
| Wofford | 11 | – | 7 | .611 | 15 | – | 17 | .469 |
| Western Carolina | 10 | – | 8 | .556 | 16 | – | 18 | .471 |
| UNC Greensboro | 10 | – | 8 | .556 | 15 | – | 19 | .441 |
| Mercer | 8 | – | 10 | .444 | 19 | – | 15 | .559 |
| Samford | 4 | – | 14 | .222 | 14 | – | 19 | .424 |
| VMI | 4 | – | 14 | .222 | 9 | – | 21 | .300 |
| The Citadel | 3 | – | 15 | .167 | 10 | – | 22 | .313 |
† 2016 SoCon Tournament winner

The 2015–16 Mercer Bears men's basketball team represented Mercer University during the 2015–16 NCAA Division I men's basketball season. The Bears, led by eighth year head coach Bob Hoffman, played their home games at Hawkins Arena on the university's Macon, Georgia campus and were second year members of the Southern Conference. They finished the season 19–15, 8–10 in SoCon play to finish in seventh place. They defeated The Citadel in the first round of the SoCon tournament to advance to the quarterfinals where they lost to East Tennessee State. They were invited to the CollegeInsider.com Tournament where they lost in the first round to Coastal Carolina.

== Murder of Jibri Bryan ==
Jibri Bryan, a sixth-year senior, was shot and killed on February 2, 2016. He was found with a gunshot wound to the head in the driver's seat of a Chevy Monte Carlo parked in a convenience store in Macon, Georgia. Bryan played in six games in the 2015–16 season due to a knee injury, averaging 7.8 points per game. Jarvis Clinton Miller has been charged in the murder of Bryan after attempting to flee from the crime scene. In a statement, Mercer coach Bob Hoffman said, "Jibri Bryan was a special young man who was a great contributor to our team and did everything that was asked of him.

== Roster ==
2015–16 Mercer Bears men's basketball team
Players
Coaches

| Pos. | # | Name | Height | Weight | Year | Hometown |
|---|---|---|---|---|---|---|
| F | 0 | Desmond Ringer | 6 ft 9 in (2.06 m) | 255 lb (116 kg) | So | McDonough, Georgia |
| G | 1 | Phillip Leonard | 6 ft 2 in (1.88 m) | 200 lb (91 kg) | Sr | Tulsa, Oklahoma |
| G | 2 | Jaylen Stowe | 6 ft 2 in (1.88 m) | 205 lb (93 kg) | RS Fr | Harrisburg, North Carolina |
| G | 3 | Tyre Moore | 6 ft 4 in (1.93 m) | 180 lb (82 kg) | So | Charleston, South Carolina |
| F | 5 | Jestin Lewis | 6 ft 1 in (1.85 m) | 170 lb (77 kg) | Sr | Richmond, Virginia |
| G | 11 | Jordan Strawberry | 6 ft 1 in (1.85 m) | 175 lb (79 kg) | So | Santa Ana, California |
| F | 15 | Stephon Jelks | 6 ft 6 in (1.98 m) | 225 lb (102 kg) | So | Marietta, Georgia |
| F | 20 | Cory Kilby | 6 ft 7 in (2.01 m) | 195 lb (88 kg) | Fr | Ada, Oklahoma |
| G | 22 | Ethan Stair | 6 ft 5 in (1.96 m) | 205 lb (93 kg) | Fr | Hazel Green, Alabama |
| F | 23 | Demetre Rivers | 6 ft 8 in (2.03 m) | 180 lb (82 kg) | So | Goose Creek, South Carolina |
| G | 25 | Lawrence Brown | 6 ft 5 in (1.96 m) | 210 lb (95 kg) | Jr | Kansas City, Missouri |
| F | 32 | James Bento | 6 ft 6 in (1.98 m) | 195 lb (88 kg) | Jr | Houston, Texas |
| G | 34 | Jibri Bryan | 6 ft 4 in (1.93 m) | 185 lb (84 kg) | Sr | Savannah, Georgia |
| F | 52 | Niklas Ney | 6 ft 10 in (2.08 m) | 260 lb (118 kg) | So | Berlin, Germany |
| C | 55 | Andrew Fishler | 7 ft 1 in (2.16 m) | 218 lb (99 kg) | Jr | Cumming, Georgia |

Head coach

- Bob Hoffman (Oklahoma Baptist)

Assistant coach(es)

- Doug Esleeck (North Carolina)
- Jarred Merrill (Oklahoma Christian)
- Jason Eaker (Texas–Pan American)

Legend

- (C) Team captain
- (S) Suspended
- (I) Ineligible
- (W) Walk-on
- Injured
- Current redshirt

== Schedule ==
| Date time, TV | Opponent | Result | Record | Site (attendance) city, state |
Regular season
| 11/13/2015*; 7:00 pm | Allen | W 96–70 | 1–0 | Hawkins Arena (3,201); Macon, GA |
| 11/16/2015*; 7:00 pm | George Mason | W 69–60 | 2–0 | Hawkins Arena (2,427); Macon, GA |
| 11/19/2015*; 7:00 pm | Alabama State | W 70–49 | 3–0 | Hawkins Arena (3,437); Macon, GA |
| 11/23/2015*; 7:00 pm | at Davidson | L 71–77 | 3–1 | John M. Belk Arena (3,861); Davidson, NC |
| 11/26/2015*; 8:00 pm, ASN | vs. Tulane; Challenge in Music City | W 71–61 | 4–1 | Nashville Municipal Auditorium (350); Nashville, TN |
| 11/27/2015*; 6:00 pm | vs. Appalachian State; Challenge in Music City | W 71–70 | 5–1 | Nashville Municipal Auditorium; Nashville, TN |
| 11/29/2015*; 7:00 pm, ASN | vs. Western Michigan; Challenge in Music City | W 68–65 | 6–1 | Nashville Municipal Auditorium; Nashville, TN |
| 12/02/2015*; 7:00 pm | Hiwassee; Challenge in Music City | W 82–47 | 7–1 | Hawkins Arena (2,172); Macon, GA |
| 12/05/2015*; 4:30 pm | Alcorn State | W 68–43 | 8–1 | Hawkins Arena (2,963); Macon, GA |
| 12/15/2015*; 9:00 pm, SECN | at Auburn | L 71–78 | 8–2 | Auburn Arena (8,033); Auburn, AL |
| 12/19/2015*; 8:00 pm | vs. Arkansas; North Little Rock Showcase | W 69–66 ^{OT} | 9–2 | Verizon Arena (9,120); North Little Rock, AR |
| 12/22/2015*; 9:00 pm, ESPNU | at Ohio State | L 44–64 | 9–3 | Value City Arena (11,460); Columbus |
| 12/30/2015*; 2:00 pm | at Kennesaw State | W 76–73 | 10–3 | KSU Convocation Center (1,903); Kennesaw, GA |
| 01/02/2016; 4:30 pm, ESPN3 | Samford | W 69–50 | 11–3 (1–0) | Hawkins Arena (3,715); Macon, GA |
| 01/05/2016; 7:00 pm, ESPN3 | at Chattanooga | L 62–74 | 11–4 (1–1) | McKenzie Arena (3,361); Chattanooga, TN |
| 01/09/2016; 1:00 pm, ESPN3 | at The Citadel | W 91–80 | 12–4 (2–1) | McAlister Field House; Charleston, SC |
| 01/14/2016; 7:00 pm, ESPN3 | Furman | W 69–65 | 13–4 (3–1) | Hawkins Arena (3,672); Macon, GA |
| 01/16/2016; 4:30 pm, ESPN3 | Wofford | W 70–69 ^{OT} | 14–4 (4–1) | Hawkins Arena (4,502); Macon, GA |
| 01/21/2016; 7:00 pm, ESPN3 | at East Tennessee State | L 63–65 ^{OT} | 14–5 (4–2) | Freedom Hall Civic Center (3,003); Johnson City, TN |
| 01/24/2016; 1:00 pm | at Western Carolina; Postponed from 1/23/16 | L 80–86 ^{2OT} | 14–6 (4–3) | Ramsey Center (1,112); Cullowhee, NC |
| 01/28/2016; 7:00 pm, ESPN3 | VMI | W 73–58 | 15–6 (5–3) | Hawkins Arena (2,693); Macon, GA |
| 01/30/2016; 4:30 pm, ESPN3 | UNC Greensboro | W 81–67 | 16–6 (6–3) | Hawkins Arena (4,032); Macon, GA |
| 02/01/2016; 8:00 pm | at Samford | W 85–70 | 17–6 (7–3) | Pete Hanna Center (1,263); Homewood, AL |
| 02/06/2016; 4:30 pm, ESPN3 | The Citadel | W 88–72 | 18–6 (8–3) | Hawkins Arena (4,772); Macon, GA |
| 02/08/2016; 7:00 pm, ESPN3 | Chattanooga | L 66–72 ^{OT} | 18–7 (8–4) | Hawkins Arena (3,721); Macon, GA |
| 02/11/2016; 7:00 pm, ESPN3 | at Wofford | L 70–79 | 18–8 (8–5) | Benjamin Johnson Arena (2,023); Spartanburg, SC |
| 02/13/2016; 4:00 pm, ESPN3 | at Furman | L 74–85 | 18–9 (8–6) | Timmons Arena (2,368); Greenville, SC |
| 02/18/2016; 7:00 pm, ESPN3 | Western Carolina | L 65–72 | 18–10 (8–7) | Hawkins Arena (3,627); Macon, GA |
| 02/20/2016; 4:30 pm, ESPN3 | East Tennessee State | L 74–77 | 18–11 (8–8) | Hawkins Arena (3,874); Macon, GA |
| 02/25/2016; 7:00 pm, ESPN3 | at VMI | L 82–91 | 18–12 (8–9) | Cameron Hall (1,194); Lexington, VA |
| 02/28/2016; 1:00 pm, ESPN3 | at UNC Greensboro | L 65–69 | 18–13 (8–10) | Greensboro Coliseum (3,156); Greensboro, NC |
SoCon tournament
| 03/04/2016; 7:30 pm, ESPN3 | vs. The Citadel; First round | W 71–69 | 19–13 | U.S. Cellular Center (2,411); Asheville, NC |
| 03/05/2016; 6:00 pm, ESPN3 | vs. East Tennessee State; Quarterfinals | L 65–81 | 19–14 | U.S. Cellular Center; Asheville, NC |
CIT
| 03/15/2016*; 7:00 pm | at Coastal Carolina; First round | L 57–65 | 19–15 | HTC Center (940); Conway, SC |
*Non-conference game. ^{#}Rankings from AP Poll. (#) Tournament seedings in parentheses. All times are in Eastern Time.
