= 2015–16 Furman Paladins men's basketball team =

American college basketball season

2015–16 Furman Paladins men's basketball

CIT, Second round
- Conference: Southern Conference
- Record: 19–16 (11–7 SoCon)
- Head coach: Niko Medved (3rd season)
- Assistant coaches: Bob Richey; Jay McAuley; Dwight Perry
- Home arena: Timmons Arena

2015–16 Southern Conference men's basketball standings
	Conf.				Overall
Team	W		L	PCT	W		L	PCT
Chattanooga †	15	–	3	.833	29	–	6	.829
East Tennessee State	14	–	4	.778	24	–	12	.667
Furman	11	–	7	.611	19	–	16	.543
Wofford	11	–	7	.611	15	–	17	.469
Western Carolina	10	–	8	.556	16	–	18	.471
UNC Greensboro	10	–	8	.556	15	–	19	.441
Mercer	8	–	10	.444	19	–	15	.559
Samford	4	–	14	.222	14	–	19	.424
VMI	4	–	14	.222	9	–	21	.300
The Citadel	3	–	15	.167	10	–	22	.313
† 2016 SoCon Tournament winner

The 2015–16 Furman Paladins men's basketball team represented Furman University during the 2015–16 NCAA Division I men's basketball season. The Paladins, led by third year head coach Niko Medved, played their home games at Timmons Arena and were members of the Southern Conference. They finished the season 19–16, 11–7 in SoCon play to finish in a tie for third place. They defeated UNC Greensboro to advance to the semifinals of the SoCon tournament where they lost to East Tennessee State. They were invited to the CollegeInsider.com Tournament where they defeated Louisiana–Monroe in the first round to advance to the second round where they lost to Louisiana–Lafayette.

== Roster ==
Number	Name	Position	Height	Weight	Year	Hometown
1	John Davis III	Guard	5–10	160	Sophomore	Beachwood, Ohio
2	Jalen Williams	Forward	6–8	245	Freshman	Greenville, South Carolina
3	Geoff Beans	Forward	6–7	210	Sophomore	Toledo, Ohio
4	T. K. Hayes	Guard	6–1	175	Junior	Chester, New Jersey
5	Andrew Brown	Guard	6–4	190	Freshman	Travelers Rest, South Carolina
10	Gene Langan	Forward	6–6	195	Sophomore	Greenville, South Carolina
11	Jonathan Jean	Guard	5–11	170	Freshman	Tampa, Florida
12	Devin Sibley	Guard	6–2	175	Sophomore	Knoxville, Tennessee
14	Stephen Croone	Guard	6–0	170	Senior	Covington, Georgia
15	Isaiah Watkins	Forward	6–8	220	Sophomore	Toronto, Ontario
21	Kris Acox	Forward	6–6	215	Junior	Reykjavík, Iceland
24	Larry Wideman	Guard	6–4	190	Senior	Loris, South Carolina
30	Kendrec Ferrara	Forward	6–9	235	Senior	Cape Coral, Florida
32	Matt Rafferty	Forward	6–8	215	Freshman	Hinsdale, Illinois
35	Daniel Fowler	Guard	6–4	195	Sophomore	Acworth, Georgia

== Schedule ==
Date time, TV	Opponent	Result	Record	Site (attendance) city, state
Exhibition
10/30/2015*; 7:00 pm	North Greenville	W 90–57		Timmons Arena (962); Greenville, SC
Regular season
11/13/2015*; 7:00 pm, ESPN3	Presbyterian	W 63–53	1–0	Timmons Arena (1,483); Greenville, SC
11/17/2015*; 7:00 pm	at Appalachian State	W 79–70	2–0	Holmes Center (1,090); Boone, NC
11/19/2015*; 7:00 pm	at Charlotte; Battle 4 Atlantis	L 68–77	2–1	Dale F. Halton Arena (4,562); Charlotte, NC
11/21/2015*; 12:00 pm, SNY	at No. 19 UConn; Battle 4 Atlantis	L 58–83	2–2	Gampel Pavilion (8,190); Storrs, CT
11/26/2015*; 5:30 pm	vs. Texas A&M–Corpus Christi; Battle 4 Atlantis	L 69–73	2–3	Alumni Gym (611); Elon, NC
11/27/2015*; 4:30 pm	vs. Mount St. Mary's; Battle 4 Atlantis	W 69–60	3–3	Alumni Gym (847); Elon, NC
12/01/2015*; 7:00 pm	Piedmont International	W 99–38	4–3	Timmons Arena (1,001); Greenville, SC
12/08/2015*; 7:00 pm, ESPN3	Liberty	W 79–56	5–3	Timmons Arena (1,203); Greenville, SC
12/12/2015*; 4:00 pm	Gardner–Webb	L 53–73	5–4	Timmons Arena (1,204); Greenville, SC
12/16/2015*; 7:00 pm	Bluefield	W 94–46	6–4	Timmons Arena (912); Greenville, SC
12/19/2015*; 7:00 pm	at Dayton	L 50–70	6–5	UD Arena (12,619); Dayton, OH
12/22/2015*; 7:00 pm	at Navy	L 49–62	6–6	Alumni Hall (1,131); Annapolis, MD
12/29/2015*; 7:30 pm	at UNC Asheville	L 65–67	6–7	Kimmel Arena (2,073); Asheville, NC
01/02/2016; 4:00 pm, ESPN3	VMI	W 85–57	7–7 (1–0)	Timmons Arena (1,421); Greenville, SC
01/05/2016; 7:00 pm, ESPN3	at UNC Greensboro	L 66–67	7–8 (1–1)	Greensboro Coliseum (1,638); Greensboro, NC
01/09/2016; 12:30 pm, ESPN3	Chattanooga	W 70–55	8–8 (2–1)	Timmons Arena (1,651); Greenville, SC
01/11/2016; 7:00 pm, ESPN3	Samford	W 77–57	9–8 (3–1)	Timmons Arena (1,304); Greenville, SC
01/14/2016; 7:00 pm, ESPN3	at Mercer	L 65–69	9–9 (3–2)	Hawkins Arena (3,672); Macon, GA
01/16/2016; 1:00 pm, ESPN3	at The Citadel	L 86–89	9–10 (3–3)	McAlister Field House (1,401); Charleston, SC
01/23/2016; 4:00 pm, ESPN3	Wofford	W 63–62	10–10 (4–3)	Timmons Arena (2,252); Greenville, SC
01/25/2016; 7:00 pm, ESPN3	at VMI	W 68–56	11–10 (5–3)	Cameron Hall (1,185); Lexington, VA
01/28/2016; 7:00 pm, ESPN3	Western Carolina	W 62–60	12–10 (6–3)	Timmons Arena (1,748); Greenville, SC
01/30/2016; 4:00 pm, ESPN3	East Tennessee State	W 74–70	13–10 (7–3)	Timmons Arena (2,004); Greenville, SC
02/04/2016; 8:00 pm, ESPN3	at Samford	W 67–65	14–10 (8–3)	Pete Hanna Center (1,654); Homewood, AL
02/06/2016; 5:00 pm	at Chattanooga	L 54–62	14–11 (8–4)	McKenzie Arena (4,894); Chattanooga, TN
02/08/2016; 7:00 pm	UNC Greensboro	W 79–72	15–11 (9–4)	Timmons Arena (1,110); Greenville, SC
02/11/2016; 7:00 pm, ESPN3	The Citadel	W 95–75	16–11 (10–4)	Timmons Arena (1,606); Greenville, SC
02/13/2016; 4:00 pm, ESPN3	Mercer	W 85–74	17–11 (11–4)	Timmons Arena (2,368); Greenville, SC
02/20/2016; 7:00 pm	at Wofford	L 73–77	17–12 (11–5)	Benjamin Johnson Arena (3,120); Spartanburg, SC
02/25/2016; 7:00 pm, ESPN3	at East Tennessee State	L 75–80	17–13 (11–6)	Freedom Hall Civic Center (3,016); Johnson City, TN
02/27/2016; 2:00 pm	at Western Carolina	L 62–73	17–14 (11–7)	Ramsey Center (1,810); Cullowhee, NC
SoCon tournament
03/05/2016; 8:30 pm, ESPN3	vs. UNC Greensboro; Quarterfinals	W 80–64	18–14	U.S. Cellular Center (5,164); Asheville, NC
03/06/2016; 7:30 pm, ESPN3	vs. East Tennessee State; Semifinals	L 76–84	18–15	U.S. Cellular Center (6,019); Asheville, NC
CIT
03/15/2016*; 7:00 pm	Louisiana–Monroe; First round	W 58–57	19–15	Timmons Arena (806); Greenville, SC
03/19/2016*; 2:00 pm	Louisiana–Lafayette; Second round	L 72–80	19–16	Timmons Arena (1,308); Greenville, SC
*Non-conference game. ^{#}Rankings from AP Poll. (#) Tournament seedings in parentheses. All times are in Eastern Time.
