= 2015–16 Wofford Terriers men's basketball team =

American college basketball season

2015–16 Wofford Terriers men's basketball
- Conference: Southern Conference
- Record: 15–17 (11–7 SoCon)
- Head coach: Mike Young (14th season)
- Assistant coaches: Dustin Kerns; Tim Johnson; Kevin Giltner
- Home arena: Benjamin Johnson Arena

2015–16 Southern Conference men's basketball standings
| | Conf. | | | | Overall |
| Team | W | | L | PCT | W | | L | PCT |
|---|---|---|---|---|---|---|---|---|
| Chattanooga † | 15 | – | 3 | .833 | 29 | – | 6 | .829 |
| East Tennessee State | 14 | – | 4 | .778 | 24 | – | 12 | .667 |
| Furman | 11 | – | 7 | .611 | 19 | – | 16 | .543 |
| Wofford | 11 | – | 7 | .611 | 15 | – | 17 | .469 |
| Western Carolina | 10 | – | 8 | .556 | 16 | – | 18 | .471 |
| UNC Greensboro | 10 | – | 8 | .556 | 15 | – | 19 | .441 |
| Mercer | 8 | – | 10 | .444 | 19 | – | 15 | .559 |
| Samford | 4 | – | 14 | .222 | 14 | – | 19 | .424 |
| VMI | 4 | – | 14 | .222 | 9 | – | 21 | .300 |
| The Citadel | 3 | – | 15 | .167 | 10 | – | 22 | .313 |
† 2016 SoCon Tournament winner

The 2015–16 Wofford Terriers men's basketball team represented Wofford College during the 2015–16 NCAA Division I men's basketball season. The Terriers, led by 14th year head coach Mike Young, played their home games at the Benjamin Johnson Arena and were members of the Southern Conference. They finished the season 15–17, 11–7 in SoCon play to finish in a tie for third place. They lost in the quarterfinals of the SoCon tournament to Western Carolina.

== Roster ==
| Number | Name | Position | Height | Weight | Year | Hometown |
|---|---|---|---|---|---|---|
| 1 | Derrick Brooks | Guard | 6–2 | 195 | Sophomore | Hinesville, Georgia |
| 2 | Jimmy Jent | Guard | 6–4 | 185 | Freshman | Sacramento, California |
| 3 | Fletcher Magee | Guard | 6–4 | 195 | Freshman | Orlando, Florida |
| 4 | Zach Korkowski | Forward | 6–6 | 215 | Senior | Williamsburg, Virginia |
| 5 | Eric Garcia | Guard | 6–0 | 185 | Junior | Aurora, Colorado |
| 10 | Larry McKnight Jr. | Guard | 6–4 | 225 | Freshman | Miami, Florida |
| 11 | Bobby Perez | Guard | 5–11 | 165 | Sophomore | Atlanta, Georgia |
| 12 | Spencer Collins | Guard | 6–4 | 205 | Senior | Easley, South Carolina |
| 15 | Trevor Stumpe | Guard | 6–5 | 200 | Freshman | Plainfield, Illinois |
| 20 | Jaylen Allen | Guard | 6–3 | 185 | Junior | Johnson City, Tennessee |
| 24 | Justin Gordon | Forward | 6–6 | 215 | Senior | Charlotte, North Carolina |
| 31 | C.J. Neumann | Forward | 6–7 | 235 | Senior | St. Paul, Minnesota |
| 33 | Cameron Jackson | Forward | 6–7 | 235 | Sophomore | Winchester, Virginia |
| 35 | Ryan Sawvell | Forward | 6–8 | 215 | Junior | Mundelein, Illinois |
| 40 | Eric Wagenlander | Guard | 6–2 | 180 | Junior | Mt. Pleasant, South Carolina |
| 50 | Matthew Pegram | Center | 6–11 | 240 | Freshman | Mt. Pleasant, South Carolina |

== Schedule ==
| Date time, TV | Opponent | Result | Record | Site (attendance) city, state |
Regular season
| 11/13/2015*; 8:00 am, SECN+ | at Missouri; CBE Hall of Fame Classic | L 74–83 | 0–1 | Mizzou Arena (5,037); Columbia, SC |
| 11/18/2015*; 7:00 pm, ACCN | at No. 1 North Carolina; CBE Hall of Fame Classic | L 58–78 | 0–2 | Dean Smith Center (12,095); Chapel Hill, NC |
| 11/21/2015*; 12:00 pm | Maryland Eastern Shore; CBE Hall of Fame Classic | W 73–63 | 1–2 | Benjamin Johnson Arena (1,970); Spartanburg, SC |
| 11/24/2015*; 7:00 pm | at Columbia; CBE Hall of Fame Classic | L 59–70 | 1–3 | Levien Gymnasium (840); New York, New York |
| 11/28/2015*; 7:00 pm | at Presbyterian | W 68–58 | 2–3 | Templeton Center (715); Clinton, SC |
| 12/01/2015*; 7:00 pm, ESPN3 | at Georgia Tech | L 61–77 | 2–4 | McCamish Pavilion (4,389); Atlanta, GA |
| 12/03/2015*; 7:00 pm | Kentucky Christian | W 86–66 | 3–4 | Benjamin Johnson Arena (870); Spartanburg, SC |
| 12/06/2015*; 2:00 pm, ESPN3 | at Clemson | L 51–66 | 3–5 | Bon Secours Wellness Arena (4,945); Greenville, SC |
| 12/14/2015*; 7:00 pm, ESPN3 | Coastal Carolina | L 63–71 | 3–6 | Benjamin Johnson Arena (1,026); Spartanburg, SC |
| 12/19/2015*; 3:00 pm, SECN | at No. 23 Vanderbilt | L 56–80 | 3–7 | Memorial Gymnasium (10,667); Nashville, TN |
| 12/22/2015*; 8:00 pm | at Austin Peay | L 77–84 | 3–8 | Dunn Center (1,975); Clarksville, TN |
| 12/31/2015*; 2:30 pm | at Harvard | L 57–77 | 3–9 | Lavietes Pavilion (1,503); Cambridge, MA |
| 01/02/2016; 7:00 pm | UNC Greensboro | W 87–76 | 4–9 (1–0) | Benjamin Johnson Arena (1,080); Spartanburg, SC |
| 01/05/2016; 7:00 pm, ESPN3 | at VMI | W 65–61 | 5–9 (2–0) | Cameron Hall (985); Lexington, VA |
| 01/09/2016; 2:00 pm | Samford | W 69–64 | 6–9 (3–0) | Benjamin Johnson Arena (1,948); Spartanburg, SC |
| 01/11/2016; 7:00 pm, ESPN3 | Chattanooga | L 68–77 | 6–10 (3–1) | Benjamin Johnson Arena (1,108); Spartanburg, SC |
| 01/14/2016; 6:00 pm, ESPN3 | at The Citadel | W 86–83 | 7–10 (4–1) | McAlister Field House (1,481); Charleston, SC |
| 01/16/2016; 4:30 pm, ESPN3 | at Mercer | L 69–70 ^{OT} | 7–11 (4–2) | Hawkins Arena (4,502); Macon, GA |
| 01/19/2016*; 7:00 pm | Tennessee Wesleyan | W 89–66 | 8–11 | Benjamin Johnson Arena (880); Spartanburg, SC |
| 01/23/2016; 4:00 pm, ESPN3 | at Furman | L 62–63 | 8–12 (4–3) | Timmons Arena (2,252); Greenville, SC |
| 01/28/2016; 7:00 pm | East Tennessee State | W 87–73 | 9–12 (5–3) | Benjamin Johnson Arena (1,412); Spartanburg, SC |
| 01/30/2016; 7:00 pm | Western Carolina | W 85–66 | 10–12 (6–3) | Benjamin Johnson Arena (2,070); Spartanburg, SC |
| 02/04/2016; 7:30 pm | at Chattanooga | L 63–79 | 10–13 (6–4) | McKenzie Arena (3,340); Chattanooga, TN |
| 02/06/2016; 4:00 pm, ESPN3 | at Samford | W 78–75 | 11–13 (7–4) | Pete Hanna Center (1,047); Homewood, AL |
| 02/08/2016; 7:00 pm | VMI | W 92–60 | 12–13 (8–4) | Benjamin Johnson Arena (1,129); Spartanburg, SC |
| 02/11/2016; 7:00 pm, ESPN3 | Mercer | W 79–70 | 13–13 (9–4) | Benjamin Johnson Arena (2,023); Spartanburg, SC |
| 02/13/2016; 7:00 pm, ESPN3 | The Citadel | W 99–89 | 14–13 (10–4) | Benjamin Johnson Arena (2,430); Spartanburg, SC |
| 02/15/2016; 7:00 pm, ESPN3 | at UNC Greensboro | L 61–65 | 14–14 (10–5) | Greensboro Coliseum (2,035); Greensboro, NC |
| 02/20/2016; 7:00 pm | Furman | W 77–73 | 15–14 (11–5) | Benjamin Johnson Arena (3,120); Spartanburg, SC |
| 02/25/2016; 7:00 pm | at Western Carolina | L 48–53 | 15–15 (11–6) | Ramsey Center (1,112); Cullowhee, NC |
| 02/27/2016; 4:00 pm, ESPN3 | at East Tennessee State | L 66–71 | 15–16 (11–7) | Freedom Hall Civic Center (4,104); Johnson City, TN |
SoCon tournament
| 03/05/2016; 2:30 pm, ESPN3 | vs. Western Carolina; Quarterfinals | L 83–88 ^{2OT} | 15–17 | U.S. Cellular Center (5,667); Asheville, NC |
*Non-conference game. ^{#}Rankings from AP Poll. (#) Tournament seedings in parentheses. All times are in Eastern Time.
