= 2015–16 Samford Bulldogs men's basketball team =

American college basketball season

2015–16 Samford Bulldogs men's basketball
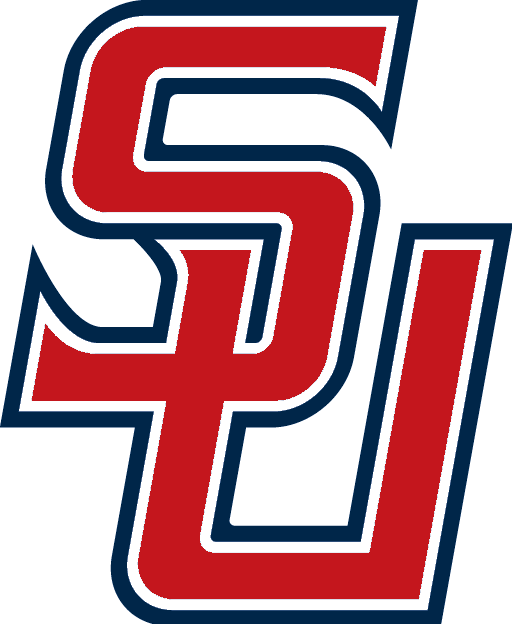

Mean Green Showcase Champions
- Conference: Southern Conference
- Record: 14–19 (4–14 SoCon)
- Head coach: Scott Padgett (2nd season)
- Assistant coaches: Jake Headrick; Sidney Ball; Charles Newton
- Home arena: Pete Hanna Center

2015–16 Southern Conference men's basketball standings
	Conf.				Overall
Team	W		L	PCT	W		L	PCT
Chattanooga †	15	–	3	.833	29	–	6	.829
East Tennessee State	14	–	4	.778	24	–	12	.667
Furman	11	–	7	.611	19	–	16	.543
Wofford	11	–	7	.611	15	–	17	.469
Western Carolina	10	–	8	.556	16	–	18	.471
UNC Greensboro	10	–	8	.556	15	–	19	.441
Mercer	8	–	10	.444	19	–	15	.559
Samford	4	–	14	.222	14	–	19	.424
VMI	4	–	14	.222	9	–	21	.300
The Citadel	3	–	15	.167	10	–	22	.313
† 2016 SoCon Tournament winner

The 2015–16 Samford Bulldogs men's basketball team represented Samford University during the 2015–16 NCAA Division I men's basketball season. The Bulldogs, led by second year head coach Scott Padgett, played their home games at the Pete Hanna Center and were members of the Southern Conference. They finished the season 14–19, 4–14 in SoCon play to finish in a tie for eighth place. They defeated VMI in the first round of the SoCon tournament to advance to the quarterfinals where they lost to Chattanooga.

== Roster ==
Number	Name	Position	Height	Weight	Year	Hometown
00	Christen Cunningham	Guard	6–1	185	Sophomore	Georgetown, Kentucky
1	Jamal Shabazz	Guard/Forward	6–6	200	Senior	Pflugerville, Texas
2	Marcus Johnson	Guard	5–11	185	Senior	Washington, D.C.
12	Matt Rose	Forward	6–7	200	Freshman	Lexington, Kentucky
13	Eric Adams	Forward	6–7	185	Sophomore	Hoover, Alabama
14	Tanner Tapp	Guard	6–2	180	Freshman	Brentwood, Tennessee
15	Darius Jones-Gibson	Guard	6–1	175	Senior	Lexington, Kentucky
20	Alex Thompson	Forward	6–8	210	Junior	Dothan, Alabama
22	Demetrius Dyson	Guard	6–5	200	Junior	Covington, Tennessee
23	Iman Johnson	Forward	6–5	215	Senior	Milwaukee, Wisconsin
24	Gerald Smith	Guard	6–4	185	Freshman	Carbon Hill, Alabama
33	Wyatt Walker	Center	6–9	230	Freshman	Jacksonville, Florida
44	Dakota Quinn	Forward/Center	6–9	215	Freshman	Nashville, Tennessee
55	Alex Peters	Forward/Center	6–8	225	Sophomore	Mountain Brook, Alabama

== Schedule ==
Date time, TV	Opponent	Result	Record	Site (attendance) city, state
Regular season
11/13/2015*; 6:00 pm, ESPN3	at Louisville	L 45–86	0–1	KFC Yum! Center (20,347); Louisville, KY
11/16/2015*; 7:00 pm	Auburn–Montgomery; Mean Green Showcase	W 94–79	1–1	Pete Hanna Center (1,253); Homewood, AL
11/21/2015*; 6:00 pm	Kennesaw State	W 77–65	2–1	Pete Hanna Center (724); Homewood, AL
11/23/2015*; 5:00 pm	vs. Troy; Mean Green Showcase	W 83–79	3–1	The Super Pit (225); Denton, TX
11/24/2015*; 7:30 pm	at North Texas; Mean Green Showcase	W 74–72	4–1	The Super Pit (1,646); Denton, TX
11/25/2015*; 2:00 pm	vs. Idaho; Mean Green Showcase	W 75–58	5–1	The Super Pit (177); Denton, TX
11/28/2015*; 7:00 pm	at Austin Peay	L 73–74	5–2	Dunn Center (1,343); Clarksville, TN
12/01/2015*; 7:00 pm	at Jacksonville State	W 77–71	6–2	Pete Mathews Coliseum (1,491); Jacksonville, AL
12/04/2015*; 8:00 pm, LHN	at Texas	L 49–59	6–3	Frank Erwin Center (10,762); Austin, TX
12/12/2015*; 6:00 pm	at Florida A&M	W 86–67	7–3	Teaching Gym (593); Tallahassee, FL
12/18/2015*; 7:00 pm	South Alabama	L 70–72 ^{2OT}	7–4	Pete Hanna Center (1,864); Homewood, AL
12/20/2015*; 6:00 pm, BTN	at Nebraska	W 69-58	8–4	Pinnacle Bank Arena (14,871); Lincoln, NE
12/29/2015*; 7:00 pm	Miles	W 104–76	9–4	Pete Hanna Center (1,052); Homewood, AL
01/02/2016; 3:30 pm, ESPN3	at Mercer	L 50–69	9–5 (0–1)	Hawkins Arena; Macon, GA
01/05/2016; 7:00 pm, ESPN3	The Citadel	W 94–74	10–5 (1–1)	Pete Hanna Center (834); Homewood, AL
01/09/2016; 1:00 pm	at Wofford	L 64–69	10–6 (1–2)	Benjamin Johnson Arena (1,948); Spartanburg, SC
01/11/2016; 6:00 pm, ESPN3	at Furman	L 57–77	10–7 (1–3)	Timmons Arena (1,304); Greenville, SC
01/14/2016; 7:00 pm, ESPN3	East Tennessee State	L 77–81	10–8 (1–4)	Pete Hanna Center (1,066); Homewood, AL
01/16/2016; 6:00 pm, ESPN3	Western Carolina	W 84–68	11–8 (2–4)	Pete Hanna Center (1,781); Homewood, AL
01/21/2016; 6:00 pm, ESPN3	at VMI	L 76–83	11–9 (2–5)	Pete Hanna Center (1,189); Homewood, AL
01/24/2016; 1:00 pm, ESPN3	at UNC Greensboro; Postponed from 1/23/16	L 78–86	11–10 (2–6)	Greensboro Coliseum (1,755); Greensboro, NC
01/30/2016; 6:00 pm, ESPN3	Chattanooga	L 56–63	11–11 (2–7)	Pete Hanna Center (2,549); Homewood, AL
02/01/2016; 6:00 pm, ASN	Mercer	L 70–85	11–12 (2–8)	Pete Hanna Center (1,263); Homewood, AL
02/04/2016; 7:00 pm, ESPN3	Furman	L 65–67	11–13 (2–9)	Pete Hanna Center (1,654); Homewood, AL
02/06/2016; 12:00 pm, ESPN3	Wofford	L 75–78	11–14 (2–10)	Pete Hanna Center (1,047); Homewood, AL
02/08/2016; 5:00 pm, ESPN3	at The Citadel	L 86–95	12–14 (3–10)	McAlister Field House (1,742); Charleston, SC
02/11/2016; 6:00 pm, ESPN3	at East Tennessee State	L 90–94	12–15 (3–11)	Freedom Hall Civic Center; Johnson City, TN
02/13/2016; 3:30 pm	at Western Carolina	L 71–76	12–16 (3–12)	Ramsey Center (2,531); Cullowhee, NC
02/18/2016; 7:00 pm, ESPN3	UNC Greensboro	L 77–82	12–17 (3–13)	Pete Hanna Center (1,021); Homewood, AL
02/20/2016; 2:00 pm, ESPN3	VMI	W 73–67	13–17 (4–13)	Pete Hanna Center (1,332); Homewood, AL
02/27/2016; 4:00 pm, ESPN3	at Chattanooga	L 66–77	13–18 (4–14)	McKenzie Arena (5,564); Chattanooga, TN
SoCon tournament
03/04/2016; 5:00 pm, ESPN3	vs. VMI; First round	W 92–85 ^{OT}	14–18	U.S. Cellular Center (2,411); Asheville, NC
03/05/2016; 11:00 am, ESPN3	vs. Chattanooga; Quarterfinals	L 54–59	14–19	U.S. Cellular Center (5,667); Asheville, NC
*Non-conference game. ^{#}Rankings from AP Poll. (#) Tournament seedings in parentheses. All times are in Central Time.
