= Matt McCall =

Matt McCall may refer to:

- Matt McCall (NASCAR) (born 1981), American racing driver and NASCAR crew chief
- Matt McCall (basketball), American college basketball coach
