= 2015–16 VMI Keydets basketball team =

American college basketball season

2015–16 VMI Keydets basketball
- Conference: Southern Conference
- Record: 9–21 (4–14 SoCon)
- Head coach: Dan Earl (1st season)
- Assistant coaches: Steve Lepore (1st season); Chris Kreider (1st season); Jason Slay (1st season)
- Home arena: Cameron Hall

2015–16 Southern Conference men's basketball standings
	Conf.				Overall
Team	W		L	PCT	W		L	PCT
Chattanooga †	15	–	3	.833	29	–	6	.829
East Tennessee State	14	–	4	.778	24	–	12	.667
Furman	11	–	7	.611	19	–	16	.543
Wofford	11	–	7	.611	15	–	17	.469
Western Carolina	10	–	8	.556	16	–	18	.471
UNC Greensboro	10	–	8	.556	15	–	19	.441
Mercer	8	–	10	.444	19	–	15	.559
Samford	4	–	14	.222	14	–	19	.424
VMI	4	–	14	.222	9	–	21	.300
The Citadel	3	–	15	.167	10	–	22	.313
† 2016 SoCon Tournament winner

The 2015–16 VMI Keydets basketball team represented Virginia Military Institute in the 2015–16 NCAA Division I men's basketball season. The Keydets were led by first-year head coach Dan Earl and played their home games out of Cameron Hall, their home since 1981. Earl replaced Duggar Baucom, who departed for military rival The Citadel in March 2015. The Keydets played as a member of the Southern Conference for the second consecutive year, having been in the Big South Conference from 2003 to 2014. Prior to that, VMI was a member of the SoCon for nearly eighty years. They finished the season 9–21, 4–14 in SoCon play to finish in a tie for eighth place. They lost in the first round of the SoCon tournament to Samford.

== Preseason ==
=== Departures ===
In addition to four seniors, VMI also lost sophomore forward Craig Hinton to transfer.

Name	Position	Class	Reason
Niles Tate	SG	Fr.	Left team
Craig Hinton	SF	So.	Transfer
Tyrell Mason	F	So.	Left team
Brian Brown	SG	Sr.	Graduated
Christian Burton	PG	Sr.	Graduated
Michael Donovan	G	Sr.	Graduated
Jarid Watson	C	Sr.	Graduated

=== Coaching changes ===
In addition to the departure of Baucom, VMI assistant coaches Daniel Willis and Ryan Mattocks also left for The Citadel. Willis came to VMI in 2005 along with Baucom, and Mattocks was hired prior to the 2012–13 season. Additionally, the contract of assistant coach Ben Thompson, who was in his first season with the program, was not renewed.

In May, Earl announced three hires to the coaching staff: Steve Lepore, Chris Kreider, and Jason Slay. Lepore came from Hargrave Military Academy and played college basketball at Wake Forest where he graduated in 2003. Kreider most recently served as an assistant coach at George Mason for four seasons, and also worked with former Southern Conference member Georgia Southern for two years. Slay had been an assistant at SoCon rival East Tennessee State the past two seasons, and played collegiately at West Virginia State.

=== Recruiting ===
College recruiting information
Name	Hometown	School	Height	Weight	Commit date
Austin Vereen; SG	Washington, D.C.	Maret School	6 ft 4 in (1.93 m)	190 lb (86 kg)	Nov 16, 2014
Austin Vereen; SG	Recruit ratings: No ratings found				
D'Andre Mahaffey; SF	Athens, GA	Cedar Shoals High School	6 ft 6 in (1.98 m)	195 lb (88 kg)	Sep 21, 2014
D'Andre Mahaffey; SF	Recruit ratings: No ratings found				
Adrian Rich; PG	Fuquay-Varina, NC	Fishburne Military School	6 ft 2 in (1.88 m)	N/A	May 6, 2014
Adrian Rich; PG	Recruit ratings: No ratings found				
Overall recruit ranking:
Note: In many cases, Scout, Rivals, 247Sports, On3, and ESPN may conflict in their listings of height and weight.; In these cases, the average was taken. ESPN grades are on a 100-point scale.; Sources: "ESPN – VMI Basketball Recruiting 2015". ESPN.; "2015 Team Ranking". Rivals.

== Roster ==
2015–16 VMI Keydets men's basketball team
Players
Coaches

Pos.	#	Name	Height	Weight	Year	Previous school	Hometown
G	0	Austin Vereen	6 ft 4 in (1.93 m)	190 lb (86 kg)	Fr	Maret School	Washington, D.C.
G	3	Adrian Rich	6 ft 2 in (1.88 m)	—	Fr	Fishburne Military	Fuquay-Varina, NC
C	5	Fred Iruafemi	6 ft 7 in (2.01 m)	200 lb (91 kg)	So	Middle Creek	Apex, NC
F	12	D'Andre Mahaffey	6 ft 6 in (1.98 m)	195 lb (88 kg)	Fr	Cedar Shoals	Athens, GA
F	14	Will Weethee	6 ft 6 in (1.98 m)	190 lb (86 kg)	Fr	East Forsyth High School	Greensboro, NC
F	15	Trey Chapman	6 ft 6 in (1.98 m)	205 lb (93 kg)	Jr	Wesleyan Christian	Greensboro, NC
F	21	Armani Branch	6 ft 7 in (2.01 m)	172 lb (78 kg)	So	Genesis Academy	Hampton, VA
G	22	QJ Peterson	6 ft 0 in (1.83 m)	170 lb (77 kg)	Jr	Hedgesville/Massanutten	Hedgesville, WV
G	23	Tim Marshall	6 ft 3 in (1.91 m)	185 lb (84 kg)	Sr	Landstown	Virginia Beach, VA
F	32	Phillip Anglade	6 ft 5 in (1.96 m)	210 lb (95 kg)	Sr	Davidson Day	Long Island, NY
G	35	Julian Eleby	6 ft 3 in (1.91 m)	190 lb (86 kg)	Jr	Village Christian/Fork Union	Fayetteville, NC
F	40	Jordan Weethee	6 ft 6 in (1.98 m)	220 lb (100 kg)	RS Sr	High Point Christian	Greensboro, NC

Head coach

- Dan Earl (Penn State '97)

Assistant coach(es)

- Steve Lepore (Wake Forest '03)
- Chris Kreider (Lebanon Valley '03)
- Jason Slay (West Va. State '08)

Legend

- (C) Team captain
- (S) Suspended
- (I) Ineligible
- (W) Walk-on
- Injured
- Current redshirt

=== Depth chart ===
Pos.	Starting 5	Bench 1	Bench 2
PF	Phillip Anglade	Fred Iruafemi	Armani Branch
SF	Trey Chapman	Jordan Weethee	D'Andre Mahaffey
SG	Tim Marshall
SG	QJ Peterson	Austin Vereen
PG	Julian Eleby	Adrian Rich

== Schedule ==
Date time, TV	Opponent	Result	Record	Site (attendance) city, state
Regular season
November 14*; 1:00 pm	at Penn State	L 50–62	0–1	Bryce Jordan Center (5,959); University Park, PA
November 17*; 7:30 pm	Tusculum	W 88–76	1–1	Cameron Hall (914); Lexington, VA
November 21*; 7:00 pm, ESPN3	at Virginia Tech	L 52–76	1–2	Cassell Coliseum (5,644); Blacksburg, VA
November 24*; 7:00 pm	Presbyterian	W 76–61	2–2	Cameron Hall (1,010); Lexington, VA
November 30*; 7:00 pm	at Campbell	L 65–66	2–3	Gore Arena (1,440); Buies Creek, NC
December 2*; 7:00 pm	Central Penn	W 107–72	3–3	Cameron Hall (1,043); Lexington, VA
December 5*; 4:30 pm, BTN	at Ohio State	L 62–80	3–4	Value City Arena (12,132); Columbus, OH
December 7*; 7:00 pm, FSN	at No. 18 Butler	L 66–93	3–5	Hinkle Fieldhouse (6,202); Indianapolis, IN
December 12*; 1:00 pm	Navy	L 62–68	3–6	Cameron Hall (3,124); Lexington, VA
December 21*; 7:00 pm	at Gardner–Webb	W 76–75	4–6	Paul Porter Arena (781); Boiling Springs, NC
December 30*; 7:00 pm	Bridgewater	W 72–37	5–6	Cameron Hall (1,171); Lexington, VA
January 2; 4:00 pm, ESPN3	at Furman	L 57–85	5–7 (0–1)	Timmons Arena (1,421); Greenville, SC
January 5; 7:00 pm, ESPN3	Wofford	L 61–65	5–8 (0–2)	Cameron Hall (985); Lexington, VA
January 9; 4:30 pm	at Western Carolina	L 52–73	5–9 (0–3)	Ramsey Center (1,844); Cullowhee, NC
January 11; 7:00 pm, ESPN3	at East Tennessee State	L 51–88	5–10 (0–4)	Freedom Hall Civic Center (2,416); Johnson City, TN
January 17; 1:00 pm, ESPN3	at UNC Greensboro	L 68–85	5–11 (0–5)	Greensboro Coliseum (1,381); Greensboro, NC
January 21; 7:00 pm, ESPN3	Samford	W 83–76	6–11 (1–5)	Cameron Hall (1,189); Lexington, VA
January 25; 7:00 pm, ESPN3	Furman	L 56–68	6–12 (1–6)	Cameron Hall (1,185); Lexington, VA
January 28; 7:00 pm, ESPN3	at Mercer	L 58–73	6–13 (1–7)	Hawkins Arena (2,693); Macon, GA
January 30; 1:00 pm, ESPN3	at The Citadel	L 75–78	6–14 (1–8)	McAlister Field House (3,535); Charleston, SC
February 4; 7:00 pm, ESPN3	East Tennessee State	L 60–71	6–15 (1–9)	Cameron Hall (1,178); Lexington, VA
February 6; 1:00 pm, ESPN3	Western Carolina	L 60–69	6–16 (1–10)	Cameron Hall (2,379); Lexington, VA
February 8; 7:00 pm	at Wofford	L 60–92	6–17 (1–11)	Benjamin Johnson Arena (1,129); Spartanburg, SC
February 11; 7:00 pm, ESPN3	UNC Greensboro	W 86–72	7–17 (2–11)	Cameron Hall (1,134); Lexington, VA
February 18; 7:00 pm	at Chattanooga	L 59–85	7–18 (2–12)	McKenzie Arena (3,589); Chattanooga, TN
February 20; 3:00 pm, ESPN3	at Samford	L 67–73	7–19 (2–13)	Pete Hanna Center (1,332); Homewood, AL
February 25; 7:00 pm, ESPN3	Mercer	W 91–82	8–19 (3–13)	Cameron Hall (1,194); Lexington, VA
February 27; 1:00 pm, ESPN3	The Citadel	W 111–95	9–19 (4–13)	Cameron Hall (3,327); Lexington, VA
February 29; 7:00 pm, ESPN3	Chattanooga; Postponed from 1/23/16	L 65–67	9–20 (4–14)	Cameron Hall (1,211); Lexington, VA
SoCon tournament
March 5; 5:00 pm, ESPN3	vs. Samford; First round	L 85–92 ^{OT}	9–21	U.S. Cellular Center (2,411); Asheville, NC
*Non-conference game. (#) Tournament seedings in parentheses. All times are in Eastern Time.
