= 2016 Southern Conference men's basketball tournament =

- Classification: Division I
- Season: 2015–16
- Teams: 10
- Site: U.S. Cellular Center; Asheville, North Carolina
- Champions: Chattanooga (11th title)
- Winning coach: Matt McCall (1st title)
- MVP: Greg Pryor (Chattanooga)
- Television: ESPN3, ESPN2

2015–16 Southern Conference men's basketball standings
	Conf.				Overall
Team	W		L	PCT	W		L	PCT
Chattanooga †	15	–	3	.833	29	–	6	.829
East Tennessee State	14	–	4	.778	24	–	12	.667
Furman	11	–	7	.611	19	–	16	.543
Wofford	11	–	7	.611	15	–	17	.469
Western Carolina	10	–	8	.556	16	–	18	.471
UNC Greensboro	10	–	8	.556	15	–	19	.441
Mercer	8	–	10	.444	19	–	15	.559
Samford	4	–	14	.222	14	–	19	.424
VMI	4	–	14	.222	9	–	21	.300
The Citadel	3	–	15	.167	10	–	22	.313
† 2016 SoCon Tournament winner

The 2016 Southern Conference men's basketball tournament took place Friday, March 4 through Monday, March 7 in Asheville, North Carolina, at the U.S. Cellular Center. The entire tournament was streamed on ESPN3, with the Southern Conference Championship Game televised on ESPN2 at 9 pm EST. The champion, Chattanooga, received an automatic bid into the 2016 NCAA tournament.

== Seeds ==
Seed	School	Conference	Overall	Tiebreaker
1	Chattanooga †#	15–3	26–5	
2	East Tennessee State #	14–4	21–10	
3	Furman #	11–7	17–14	1–1 vs Chattanooga
4	Wofford #	11–7	15–16	0–2 vs Chattanooga
5	Western Carolina #	10–8	15–16	2–0 vs Mercer
6	UNC Greensboro #	10–8	14–17	1–1 vs Mercer
7	Mercer	8–10	18–13	
8	Samford	4–14	13–18	1–1 vs. Western Carolina
9	VMI	4–14	9–20	0–2 vs. Western Carolina
10	The Citadel	3–15	10–21	
† – Southern Conference regular season champions, and tournament No. 1 seed. # – Received a first round bye in the conference tournament.

== Bracket ==
First round Friday, March 4
8	Samford	92^{OT}
9	VMI	85
7	Mercer	71
10	The Citadel	69

Quarterfinals; Saturday, March 5
1	Chattanooga	59
8	Samford	54
4	Wofford	83
5	Western Carolina	88^{2OT}
2	East Tennessee State	81
7	Mercer	65
3	Furman	80
6	UNC Greensboro	64

Semifinals; Sunday, March 6
1	Chattanooga	73
5	Western Carolina	69
2	East Tennessee State	84
3	Furman	76

Championship; Monday, March 7
1	Chattanooga	73
2	East Tennessee State	67

== All-tournament team ==
First Team

- T.J. Cromer, ETSU
- Ge’Lawn Guyn, ETSU
- Tre’ McLean, Chattanooga
- Greg Pryor, Chattanooga
- Mike Brown, Western Carolina

Second Team

- Desonta Bradford, ETSU
- Devin Sibley, Furman
- QJ Peterson, VMI
- Torrion Brummitt, Western Carolina
- Fletcher Magee, Wofford
