= Matt McCall (basketball) =

American college basketball coach (born 1981)

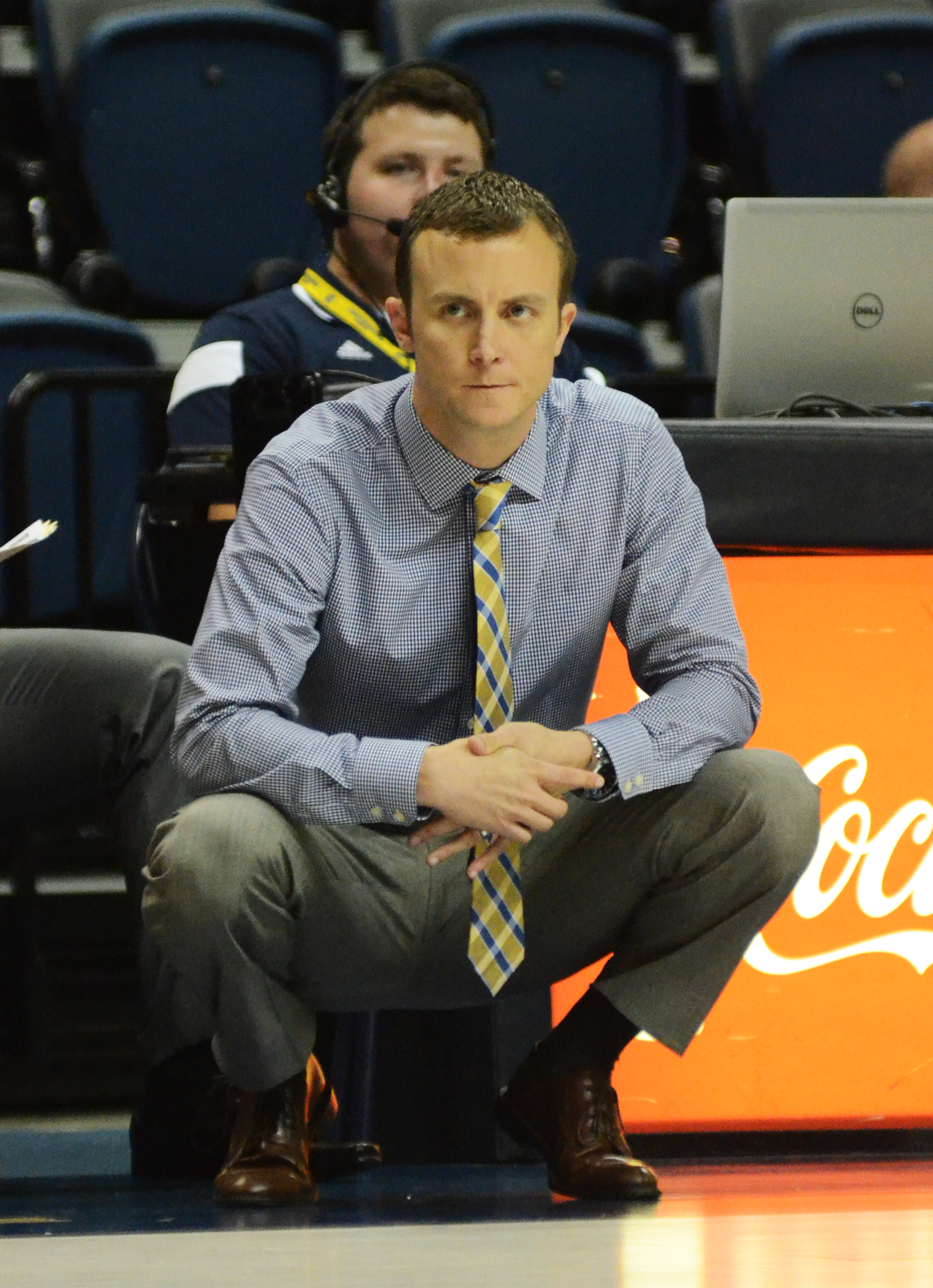
- McCall in 2015

Biographical details
- Born: December 12, 1981 (age 44); Ocala, Florida, U.S.
- Education: Florida ('04)

Coaching career (HC unless noted)
- 2008–2011: Florida Atlantic (assistant)
- 2011–2015: Florida (assistant)
- 2015–2017: Chattanooga
- 2017–2022: UMass

Administrative career (AD unless noted)
- 2006–2008: Florida (director of ops.)

Head coaching record
- Overall: 107–99 (.519)
- Tournaments: 0–1 (NCAA)

Accomplishments and honors

Championships
- SoCon regular season (2016); SoCon tournament (2016)

Awards
- SoCon Coach of the Year (2016)

Matthew Wayne McCall (born December 12, 1981) is an American college basketball coach. He was the head men's basketball coach at the University of Tennessee - Chattanooga and the University of Massachusetts Amherst (UMass).

== Coaching career ==
McCall was a student manager at the University of Florida during the 2002–03 season. He was named head manager the following year. After graduating, he continued working with the program, and in 2006 he was named director of basketball operations. In 2008, he was hired as an assistant coach at Florida Atlantic. He held that position until 2011, when he was hired by the University of Florida as an assistant. McCall was hired by Chattanooga in April 2015 after Will Wade left to take the head coaching job at VCU. In March 2016, McCall was named the Southern Conference Basketball Coach of the Year. On March 30, 2017, he was introduced as the 22nd head coach in the history of UMass men's basketball. On March 1, 2022, McCall was fired by UMass, although he was allowed to coach the remainder of the season.

== Personal life ==
McCall earned two degrees from Florida: a bachelor's (2004) in exercise and sports science and a master's (2006) in secondary education. His father, Wayne, was a three-year letterwinner for the University of Florida football team from 1965–67.

== Head coaching record ==
Record table
Season	Team	Overall	Conference	Standing	Postseason
Chattanooga (Southern Conference) (2015–2017)
2015–16	Chattanooga	29–6	15–3	1st	NCAA first round
2016–17	Chattanooga	19–12	10–8	4th	
Chattanooga:		48–18 (.727)	25–11 (.694)		
UMass Minutemen (Atlantic 10 Conference) (2017–present)
2017–18	UMass	13–20	5–13	13th	
2018–19	UMass	11–21	4–14	T–12th	
2019–20	UMass	14–17	8–10	T–8th	
2020–21	UMass	8–7	6–4	5th	
2021–22	UMass	15–17	7–11	10th	
UMass:		61–82 (.427)	30–52 (.366)		
Total:		109–100 (.522)			
National champion Postseason invitational champion Conference regular season champion Conference regular season and conference tournament champion Division regular season champion Division regular season and conference tournament champion Conference tournament champion
