= Hawkins Arena =

Basketball arena in Macon, Georgia, U.S.

- Interactive map of Hawkins Arena
- Location: 1730 Adams; Macon, GA 31207
- Coordinates: 32°49′47″N 83°39′07″W
- Owner: Mercer University
- Operator: Mercer University
- Capacity: 3,500
- Surface: Hardwood

Construction
- Groundbreaking: October 12, 2001
- Opened: January 8, 2004
- Cost: $40 million ($68.2 million in 2025 dollars)
- Architect: Cooper Carry Inc.
- General contractor: Beck Group/New South

Tenants
- Mercer Bears men's basketball (2004–present); Mercer Bears women's basketball (2004–present)

The Hawkins Arena is the basketball arena on the campus of Mercer University in Macon, Georgia, United States. The arena is located in the University Center, a large multi-purpose facility centrally located on the university campus.

== History ==
The University Center opened in 2004. The $40 million, 230,000-square-foot (21,000 m^{2}) center, houses Mercer's athletics department, a 3,500-seat basketball arena, an indoor pool, work-out facilities, intramural basketball courts, offices, a food court, and numerous meeting facilities. Mercer's baseball and softball fields are located adjacent to the center along with the university's tennis complex and football-lacrosse complex Moye Complex.

The University Center replaced Porter Gym, which stood on the Mercer campus from 1937 to 2004; Porter Gym was located on the central quadrangle and was razed when the University Center opened. The center is also located on the central quadrangle on the site of the university's original fraternity row, which was razed after a new Greek Village opened. In 2007, a 101-room Hilton Garden Inn opened on university-owned land adjacent to the University Center. Parking lots are available for visitors-spectators arriving via the Mercer University Drive exit off Interstate 75.

The University Center arena was renamed Hawkins Arena in 2012 to honor J. B. Hawkins, former high school athletic director and basketball coach in Crawford County.

== Athletics ==
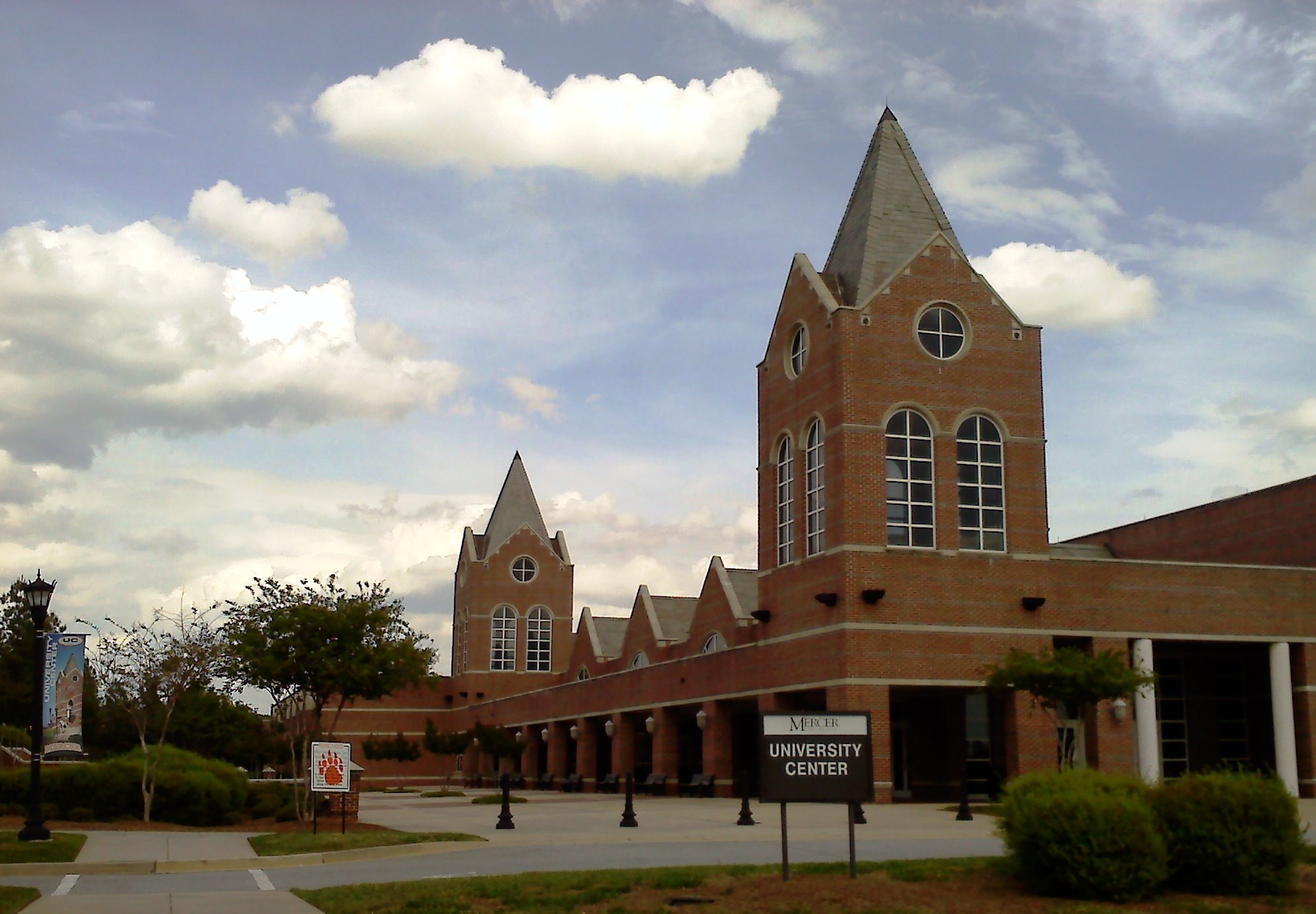
University Center (Hawkins Arena)

Mercer is an NCAA Division I member competing in the Southern Conference; the university's basketball teams play in Hawkins Arena. The men's team won the first game played at the center, a 73–55 victory over Georgia State University, on January 27, 2004. The women's team won the first game it played in the center, a 43–40 victory over Troy State University, on January 30, 2004.

In 2010, for the first time in university history, Mercer hosted the men's and women's Atlantic Sun Conference basketball tournaments. The men's team advanced to the championship game losing 72–66 to East Tennessee State University. Mercer hosted the 2011-13 tournaments as well.

In 2013, the men's team was undefeated at Hawkins Arena and won the regular season Atlantic Sun Conference championship. The team advanced to the Hawkins Arena conference tournament championship game losing to Florida Gulf Coast University; FGCU advanced to the Sweet Sixteen of the NCAA Tournament.

== Other uses ==
Aside from athletics events, Hawkins Arena hosts commencement, university press conferences, concerts, and other special events. The board of trustees meeting room, named for Mercer alumnus Griffin Bell, and the president's dining room are also in the University Center.

== See also ==
- Mercer Bears
- Claude Smith Field
- Moye Complex
- List of NCAA Division I basketball arenas
