= 2025 Atlantic Sun men's basketball tournament =

American college basketball postseason tournament

- Classification: Division I
- Season: 2024–25
- Teams: 10
- Site: Campus sites
- Champions: Lipscomb (2nd title)
- Winning coach: Lennie Acuff (1st title)
- MVP: Joe Anderson (Lipscomb)
- Attendance: 18,316 (total); 5,139 (final)
- Television: ESPN+, ESPN2

2024–25 ASUN men's basketball standings
	Conf.				Overall
Team	W		L	PCT	W		L	PCT
Lipscomb †	14	–	4	.778	25	–	10	.714
North Alabama	14	–	4	.778	24	–	11	.686
Florida Gulf Coast	13	–	5	.722	19	–	15	.559
Jacksonville	12	–	6	.667	19	–	14	.576
Eastern Kentucky	12	–	6	.667	18	–	14	.563
Queens*	11	–	7	.611	20	–	15	.571
Austin Peay	8	–	10	.444	14	–	19	.424
North Florida	8	–	10	.444	15	–	17	.469
Stetson	6	–	12	.333	8	–	24	.250
Central Arkansas	4	–	14	.222	9	–	24	.273
West Georgia*	4	–	14	.222	6	–	25	.194
Bellarmine	2	–	16	.111	5	–	26	.161
† 2025 ASUN tournament winner * ineligible for the 2025 NCAA tournament due to transition from Division II

The 2025 Atlantic Sun men's basketball tournament was the conference postseason tournament for the Atlantic Sun Conference. The tournament was the 46th year the league has conducted a postseason tournament. The tournament was held March 2–9 at campus sites of the higher seeds. The winner, Lipscomb, received the conference's automatic bid to the 2025 NCAA Tournament.

== Seeds ==
Ten teams are contesting the bracket. All rounds reseed instead of a traditional set bracket; to that end, the 9 and 10 seeds play each other in round 1, and the 7 and 8 seeds do as well, rather than the more common 7/10 and 8/9 matchups.

The three tiebreakers used by the ASUN are: 1) head-to-head record of teams with identical record, 2) comparison of tied teams' win-loss percentage vs. the top ranked team (or teams as a group in the event that they are tied), descending to the next highest placed team(s) until an advantage is gained and 3) NCAA NET rankings available on day following the conclusion of ASUN regular season play. If an advantage is gained in a tiebreaker of three or more teams, that team or teams is pulled out, and the remaining tied teams start back at step 1. If more than one team is pulled out, that set of teams would also start back at step 1.

Seed	School	Conference	Tiebreaker	NET ranking
1	Lipscomb	14–4	1–0 vs. Florida Gulf Coast	87
2	North Alabama	14–4	0–1 vs. Florida Gulf Coast	119
3	Florida Gulf Coast	13–5		168
4	Jacksonville	12–6	2–0 vs. Eastern Kentucky	180
5	Eastern Kentucky	12–6	0–2 vs. Jacksonville	178
6	Queens	11–7		216
7	Austin Peay	8–10	1–0 vs. North Florida	285
8	North Florida	8–10	0–1 vs. Austin Peay	250
9	Stetson	6–12		353
10	Central Arkansas	4–14	2–0 vs. West Georgia	349
DNQ	West Georgia	4–14	0–2 vs. Central Arkansas	347
DNQ	Bellarmine	2–16		354

== Schedule ==
Game	Time	Matchup	Score	Television
First round – Sunday, March 2 – Campus Sites
1	6:00 pm	No. 10 Central Arkansas vs. No. 9 Stetson	77–72	ESPN+
2	6:00 pm	No. 8 North Florida vs. No. 7 Austin Peay	69–90	ESPN+
Quarterfinals – Monday, March 3 – Campus Sites
3	7:00 pm	No. 10 Central Arkansas at No. 1 Lipscomb	66–84	ESPN+
4	6:00 pm	No. 5 Eastern Kentucky at No. 4 Jacksonville	67–78	ESPN+
5	6:00 pm	No. 7 Austin Peay at No. 2 North Alabama	64–90	ESPN+
6	6:00 pm	No. 6 Queens at No. 3 Florida Gulf Coast	71–65	ESPN+
Semifinals – Thursday, March 6 – Campus Sites
7	7:00 pm	No. 6 Queens at No. 1 Lipscomb	75–81^{OT}	ESPN+
8	6:00 pm	No. 4 Jacksonville at No. 2 North Alabama	63–78	ESPN+
Championship – Sunday, March 9 – Campus Site
9	1:00 pm	No. 2 North Alabama at No. 1 Lipscomb	65–76	ESPN2
*Game times in CT (UTC−6 from March 2 through 6 and UTC−5 on March 9). Rankings denote tournament seed.

== Bracket ==
First round Sunday, March 2
9	Stetson	72
10	Central Arkansas	77
7	Austin Peay	90
8	North Florida	69

Quarterfinals; Monday, March 3
1	Lipscomb	84
10	Central Arkansas	66
3	Florida Gulf Coast	65
6	Queens University	71
2	North Alabama	90
7	Austin Peay	64
4	Jacksonville	78
5	Eastern Kentucky	67

Semifinals; Thursday, March 6
1	Lipscomb	81^{OT}
6	Queens University	75
2	North Alabama	78
4	Jacksonville	63

Championship; Sunday, March 9
1	Lipscomb	76
2	North Alabama	65

== Game summaries ==
All times are in CT (UTC−6 from March 2 through 6 and UTC−5 on March 9)

=== First round ===
ESPN+

March 2
6:00 p.m.

Box

No. 10 Central Arkansas 77, No. 9 Stetson 72
Scoring by half: 32–37, 45–35
Pts: Turner (37); Rebs: Turner (11); Asts: Tied - Fagbemi, Turner (4)	Pts: Wood (25); Rebs: Thompson (6); Asts: Sagna (6)
Central Arkansas advances to ASUN quarterfinals

Allen Arena
Nashville, TN
Attendance: 207
Referees: Blake Harris, R.B. Clyburn, Jason Deering

ESPN+

March 2
6:00 p.m.

Box

No. 8 North Florida 69, No. 7 Austin Peay 90
Scoring by half: 45–38, 24–52
Pts: Murphy (16); Rebs: Tied - Harris, Miles (8); Asts: Tied - Berry, Lliteras, Miles, Moss, Murphy, Smith (2)	Pts: Tied - Dawson, Haney, Thomas (20); Rebs: McCubbin (8); Asts: Thomas (6)
Austin Peay advances to ASUN quarterfinals

CB&S Bank Arena
Florence, AL
Attendance: 147
Referees: Evan Berg, Devyn Page, James Gibson

=== Quarterfinals ===
ESPN+

March 3
7:00 p.m.

Box

No. 10 Central Arkansas 66, No. 1 Lipscomb 84
Scoring by half: 24–46, 42–38
Pts: Fagbemi (20); Rebs: Cato (6); Asts: Tied - Fagbemi, Turner (4)	Pts: Anderson (28); Rebs: Pruitt (9); Asts: Williams (5)
Lipscomb advances to ASUN semifinals

Allen Arena
Nashville, TN
Attendance: 1,694
Referees: Kevin Driver, Kyle Bottoms, Hunter Allen

ESPN+

March 3
6:00 p.m.

Box

No. 5 Eastern Kentucky 67, No. 4 Jacksonville 78
Scoring by half: 41–30, 26–48
Pts: Blanton (27); Rebs: Myrick (10); Asts: Blanton (4)	Pts: McCray V (26); Rebs: McCray V (10); Asts: Tied - McCray V, Spence (5)
Jacksonville advances to ASUN semifinals

Swisher Gymnasium
Jacksonville, FL
Attendance: 1,000
Referees: Steven Anderson, Jon Broska, Raymond Lightfoot

ESPN+

March 3
6:00 p.m.

Box

No. 7 Austin Peay 64, No. 2 North Alabama 90
Scoring by half: 30–48, 34–42
Pts: Tied - Evans, Thomas (11); Rebs: Tied - Daniel, Haney, McCubbin (5); Asts: Thomas (5)	Pts: Lane (31); Rebs: Williams (14); Asts: Fields (4)
North Alabama advances to ASUN semifinals

CB&S Bank Arena
Florence, AL
Attendance: 3,000
Referees: Chris Ford, Art Vaulk, Chuck McCoy

ESPN+

March 3
6:00 p.m.

Box

No. 6 Queens 71, No. 3 Florida Gulf Coast 65
Scoring by half: 33–36, 38–29
Pts: Colimerio (21); Rebs: Wilson (8); Asts: Colimerio (6)	Pts: McLean (18); Rebs: Kellman (13); Asts: Tied - Johnson, Reddick (3)
Queens advances to ASUN semifinals

Alico Arena
Fort Myers, FL
Attendance: 2,423
Referees: N/A

=== Semifinals ===
ESPN+

March 6
7:00 p.m.

Box

No. 6 Queens 75, No. 1 Lipscomb 81 (OT)
Scoring by half: 33–34, 34–33 Overtime: 8–14
Pts: Pollard (17); Rebs: Wilson (8); Asts: Tied - Ashby, Cash, Colimerio (3)	Pts: Anderson (25); Rebs: Ognacevic (12); Asts: Anderson (4)
Lipscomb advances to ASUN championship

Allen Arena
Nashville, TN
Attendance: 1,706
Referees: John Dillon, Michael Wallace, Jason Deering

ESPN+

March 6
6:00 p.m.

Box

No. 4 Jacksonville 63, No. 2 North Alabama 78
Scoring by half: 23–35, 40–43
Pts: McCray V (19); Rebs: McCray V (6); Asts: McCray V (5)	Pts: Lane (19); Rebs: Williams (12); Asts: Lane (6)
North Alabama advances to ASUN championship

CB&S Bank Arena
Florence, AL
Attendance: 3,000
Referees: Sidney Cohen, Michael Husted, R.B. Clyburn

=== Championship ===
ESPN2

March 9
1:00 p.m.

Box

No. 2 North Alabama 65, No. 1 Lipscomb 76
Scoring by half: 29–35, 36–41
Pts: Lane (18); Rebs: Fields (12); Asts: Fields (6)	Pts: Anderson (23); Rebs: Ognacevic (12); Asts: Anderson (4)
Lipscomb wins ASUN championship

Allen Arena
Nashville, TN
Attendance: 5,139
Referees: Vladimir Voyard-Tadal, Landon Brandes, Josue Nieves

== Awards and honors ==
Tournament MVP: Joe Anderson, Lipscomb

ASUN All-Tournament Team
- Joe Anderson, Lipscomb
- Jacob Ognacevic, Lipscomb
- Will Pruitt, Lipscomb
- Taye Fields, North Alabama
- Jacari Lane, North Alabama
- Robert McCray V, Jacksonville
- Kalib Mathews, Queens
