= 2024–25 Lipscomb Bisons men's basketball team =

American college basketball season

2024–25 Lipscomb Bisons men's basketball

ASUN regular season & tournament champions

NCAA tournament, First Round
- Conference: Atlantic Sun Conference
- Record: 25–10 (14–4 ASUN)
- Head coach: Lennie Acuff (6th season)
- Associate head coach: Tyler Murray
- Assistant coaches: Roger Idstrom; Vince Martin
- Home arena: Allen Arena

2024–25 ASUN men's basketball standings
	Conf.				Overall
Team	W		L	PCT	W		L	PCT
Lipscomb †	14	–	4	.778	25	–	10	.714
North Alabama	14	–	4	.778	24	–	11	.686
Florida Gulf Coast	13	–	5	.722	19	–	15	.559
Jacksonville	12	–	6	.667	19	–	14	.576
Eastern Kentucky	12	–	6	.667	18	–	14	.563
Queens*	11	–	7	.611	20	–	15	.571
Austin Peay	8	–	10	.444	14	–	19	.424
North Florida	8	–	10	.444	15	–	17	.469
Stetson	6	–	12	.333	8	–	24	.250
Central Arkansas	4	–	14	.222	9	–	24	.273
West Georgia*	4	–	14	.222	6	–	25	.194
Bellarmine	2	–	16	.111	5	–	26	.161
† 2025 ASUN tournament winner * ineligible for the 2025 NCAA tournament due to transition from Division II

The 2024–25 Lipscomb Bisons men's basketball team represented Lipscomb University during the 2024–25 NCAA Division I men's basketball season. The Bisons, led by sixth-year head coach Lennie Acuff, played their home games at the Allen Arena in Nashville, Tennessee as members of the Atlantic Sun Conference.

== Previous season ==
The Bisons finished the 2023–24 season 20–12, 11–5 in ASUN play to finish in a tie for second place. They were defeated by North Alabama in the quarterfinals of the ASUN tournament.

== Roster ==
2024–25 Lipscomb Bisons men's basketball team
Players
Coaches

Pos.	#	Name	Height	Weight	Year	Previous school	Hometown
F	1	Rylan Houck	6 ft 5 in (1.96 m)	192 lb (87 kg)	So	Oxford High School	Oxford, Alabama
G	2	Will Pruitt	6 ft 3 in (1.91 m)	195 lb (88 kg)	Sr	Mt. Juliet High School	Mt. Juliet, Tennessee
G	5	Miles White	6 ft 3 in (1.91 m)	185 lb (84 kg)	Jr	Rockhurst	Kansas City, Missouri
C	6	Charlie Williams	6 ft 10 in (2.08 m)	220 lb (100 kg)	Jr	William & Mary	Carmel, Indiana
G	9	Jack Ingold	6 ft 3 in (1.91 m)	190 lb (86 kg)	Sr	George Washington High School	Charleston, West Virginia
G	10	Gyasi Powell	6 ft 3 in (1.91 m)	195 lb (88 kg)	Sr	Jacksonville	Jacksonville, Florida
G	11	Logan Suber	6 ft 0 in (1.83 m)	170 lb (77 kg)	So	Mt. Zion Prep Academy	Fredericksburg, Virginia
G	12	Luke Carter	6 ft 1 in (1.85 m)	175 lb (79 kg)	So	Christian Academy of Knoxville	Knoxville, Tennessee
F	15	Dylan Faulkner	6 ft 9 in (2.06 m)	215 lb (98 kg)	So	Calhoun High School	Calhoun, Georgia
G	22	Joe Anderson	6 ft 0 in (1.83 m)	175 lb (79 kg)	Sr	Furman	Maryville, Tennessee
G/F	23	Kellan Boylan	6 ft 7 in (2.01 m)	200 lb (91 kg)	Jr	Air Force	Overland Park, Kansas
G	30	Ross Candelino	6 ft 5 in (1.96 m)	200 lb (91 kg)	Jr	Wisconsin	Jacksonville, Florida
G	33	Zach Lamey	6 ft 3 in (1.91 m)	175 lb (79 kg)	So	Briarwood Christian School	Birmingham, Alabama
C	35	Grant Asman	6 ft 11 in (2.11 m)	210 lb (95 kg)	Jr	Kimberly High School	Kimberly, Wisconsin
F	41	Jacob Ognacevic	6 ft 8 in (2.03 m)	220 lb (100 kg)	Sr	Valparaiso	Sheboygan, Wisconsin

Head coach

- Lennie Acuff (Shorter)

Assistant coach(es)

- Tyler Murray (Hampden–Sydney)
- Roger Idstrom (Mars Hill)
- Vince Martin (Jacksonville)

Legend

- (C) Team captain
- (S) Suspended
- (I) Ineligible
- (W) Walk-on
- Injured
- Current redshirt

Roster
Last update: October 21, 2024

== Schedule and results ==
Date time, TV	Rank^{#}	Opponent^{#}	Result	Record	Site (attendance) city, state
Non-conference regular season
November 4, 2024*; 7:00 pm, ESPN+		at Duquesne	W 77–72	1–0	UPMC Cooper Fieldhouse (2,274); Pittsburgh, PA
November 6, 2024*; 7:00 pm, SECN+		at No. 16 Arkansas	L 60–76	1–1	Bud Walton Arena (19,200); Fayetteville, AR
November 9, 2024*; 4:00 pm, ESPN+		Wofford; SoCon/ASUN Challenge	W 78–69	2–1	Allen Arena (2,315); Nashville, TN
November 12, 2024*; 7:00 pm, ESPN+		Belmont; Battle of the Boulevard	L 79–80	2–2	Allen Arena (4,022); Nashville, TN
November 17, 2024*; 2:00 pm, ESPN+		at Western Kentucky	L 61–66	2–3	E. A. Diddle Arena (2,712); Bowling Green, KY
November 19, 2024*; 6:00 pm, SECN+		at No. 9 Kentucky; BBN Invitational	L 68–97	2–4	Rupp Arena (19,314); Lexington, KY
November 24, 2024*; 4:00 pm, ESPN+		Jackson State; BBN Invitational	W 77–53	3–4	Allen Arena (1,227); Nashville, TN
November 30, 2024*; 7:00 pm		at Alabama A&M	W 82–44	4–4	Alabama A&M Events Center (1,371); Huntsville, AL
December 3, 2024*; 7:00 pm, ESPN+		at Chattanooga; SoCon/ASUN Challenge	W 80–62	5–4	McKenzie Arena (2,761); Chattanooga, TN
December 5, 2024*; 11:00 am, ESPN+		Southeast Missouri State	W 78–60	6–4	Allen Arena (2,123); Nashville, TN
December 16, 2024*; 7:00 pm, ESPN+		Truett McConnell	W 99–67	7–4	Allen Arena (348); Nashville, TN
December 19, 2024*; 6:30 pm, ESPN+		at Middle Tennessee	L 65–67	7–5	Murphy Center (3,432); Murfreesboro, TN
December 29, 2024*; 4:00 pm, ESPN+		Asbury	W 112–54	8–5	Allen Arena (1,337); Nashville, TN
ASUN regular season
January 2, 2025; 6:00 pm, ESPN+		at Jacksonville	W 70–65	9–5 (1–0)	Swisher Gymnasium (1,000); Jacksonville, FL
January 4, 2025; 1:00 pm, ESPN+		at North Florida	W 96–64	10–5 (2–0)	UNF Arena (1,439); Jacksonville, FL
January 9, 2025; 7:00 pm, ESPN+		Queens	L 73–75	10–6 (2–1)	Allen Arena (1,563); Nashville, TN
January 11, 2025; 4:00 pm, ESPN+		West Georgia	W 86–67	11–6 (3–1)	Allen Arena (1,864); Nashville, TN
January 16, 2025; 5:30 pm, ESPN+		at Bellarmine	W 87–53	12–6 (4–1)	Knights Hall (1,272); Louisville, KY
January 18, 2025; 6:00 pm, ESPN+		Austin Peay	W 88–60	13–6 (5–1)	Allen Arena (2,375); Nashville, TN
January 23, 2025; 6:00 pm, ESPN+		at North Alabama	L 64–74	13–7 (5–2)	CB&S Bank Arena (2,657); Florence, AL
January 25, 2025; 1:00 pm, ESPN+		at Central Arkansas	W 68–55	14–7 (6–2)	Farris Center (1,148); Conway, AR
January 30, 2025; 7:00 pm, ESPN+		Eastern Kentucky	L 71–80	14–8 (6–3)	Allen Arena (1011); Nashville, TN
February 1, 2025; 4:00 pm, ESPN+		Bellarmine	W 87–80	15–8 (7–3)	Allen Arena (1,227); Nashville, TN
February 5, 2025; 6:00 pm, ESPN+		at West Georgia	W 76–67	16–8 (8–3)	The Coliseum (774); Carrollton, GA
February 8, 2025; 3:00 pm, ESPN+		at Queens	W 94–81	17–8 (9–3)	Curry Arena (1,075); Charlotte, NC
February 13, 2025; 7:15 pm, ESPN+		Stetson	W 93–60	18–8 (10–3)	Allen Arena (1,555); Nashville, TN
February 15, 2025; 4:00 pm, ESPN+		Florida Gulf Coast	W 82–68	19–8 (11–3)	Allen Arena (2,231); Nashville, TN
February 18, 2025; 6:00 pm, ESPN+		at Eastern Kentucky	L 57–66	19–9 (11–4)	Baptist Health Arena (3,155); Richmond, KY
February 20, 2025; 7:00 pm, ESPN+		North Alabama	W 75–63	20–9 (12–4)	Allen Arena (2,431); Nashville, TN
February 24, 2025; 6:00 pm, ESPNU/ESPN+		at Austin Peay	W 95–78	21–9 (13–4)	F&M Bank Arena (3,029); Clarksville, TN
February 26, 2025; 7:00 pm, ESPN+		Central Arkansas	W 78–60	22–9 (14–4)	Allen Arena (1,777); Nashville, TN
ASUN tournament
March 3, 2025; 7:00 p.m., ESPN+	(1)	(10) Central Arkansas; Quarterfinals	W 84–66	23–9	Allen Arena (1,694); Nashville, TN
March 6, 2025; 7:00 p.m., ESPN+	(1)	(6) Queens; Semifinals	W 81–75 ^{OT}	24–9	Allen Arena (1,706); Nashville, TN
March 9, 2025; 1:00 p.m., ESPN2	(1)	(2) North Alabama; Championship	W 76–65	25–9	Allen Arena (5,139); Nashville, TN
NCAA tournament
March 21, 2025*; 12:30 p.m., TNT	(14 S)	vs. (3 S) No. 15 Iowa State; First Round	L 55–82	25–10	Fiserv Forum (16,899); Milwaukee, WI
*Non-conference game. ^{#}Rankings from AP Poll. (#) Tournament seedings in parentheses. All times are in Central.
