= 2024–25 Florida Gulf Coast Eagles men's basketball team =

American college basketball season

2024–25 Florida Gulf Coast Eagles men's basketball
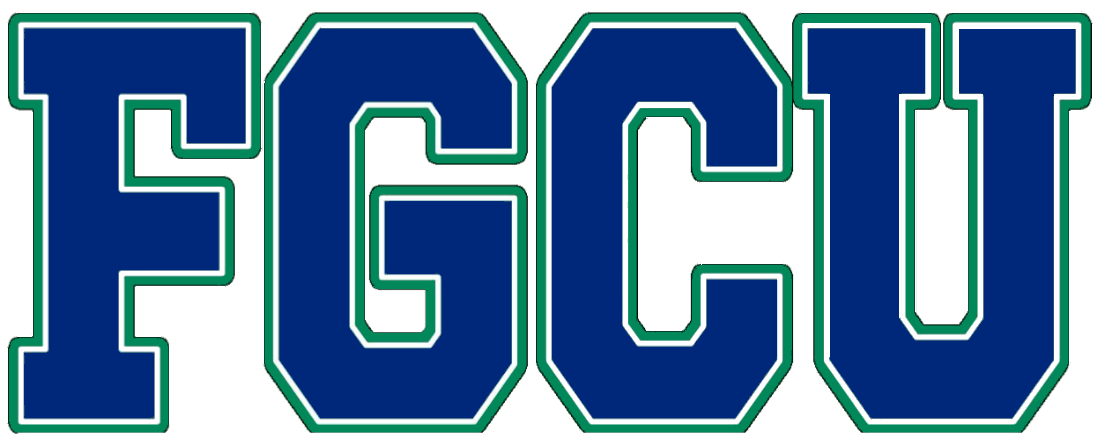

CBI, Semifinals
- Conference: Atlantic Sun Conference
- Record: 19–15 (13–5 ASUN)
- Head coach: Pat Chambers (3rd season)
- Associate head coach: Kyle Griffin
- Assistant coaches: Kevin Hudash; David Caporaletti; Shep Garner
- Home arena: Alico Arena

2024–25 ASUN men's basketball standings
	Conf.				Overall
Team	W		L	PCT	W		L	PCT
Lipscomb †	14	–	4	.778	25	–	10	.714
North Alabama	14	–	4	.778	24	–	11	.686
Florida Gulf Coast	13	–	5	.722	19	–	15	.559
Jacksonville	12	–	6	.667	19	–	14	.576
Eastern Kentucky	12	–	6	.667	18	–	14	.563
Queens*	11	–	7	.611	20	–	15	.571
Austin Peay	8	–	10	.444	14	–	19	.424
North Florida	8	–	10	.444	15	–	17	.469
Stetson	6	–	12	.333	8	–	24	.250
Central Arkansas	4	–	14	.222	9	–	24	.273
West Georgia*	4	–	14	.222	6	–	25	.194
Bellarmine	2	–	16	.111	5	–	26	.161
† 2025 ASUN tournament winner * ineligible for the 2025 NCAA tournament due to transition from Division II

The 2024–25 Florida Gulf Coast Eagles men's basketball team represented Florida Gulf Coast University during the 2024–25 NCAA Division I men's basketball season. The Eagles, led by third-year head coach Pat Chambers, played their home games at Alico Arena in Fort Myers, Florida as members of the Atlantic Sun Conference.

== Previous season ==
The Eagles finished the 2023–24 season 14–18, 8–8 in ASUN play to finish in a tie for sixth place. They were defeated by Queens in the first round of the ASUN tournament.

== Roster ==
2024–25 Florida Gulf Coast Eagles men's basketball team
Players
Coaches

Pos.	#	Name	Height	Weight	Year	Previous school	Hometown
PG	0	Jack Reddick	6 ft 3 in (1.91 m)	—	Fr	Lyon County High School	Eddyville, KY
G	1	Rahmir Barno	6 ft 0 in (1.83 m)	155 lb (70 kg)	So	Imhotep Charter High School	Philadelphia, PA
G	2	Darren Williams	6 ft 4 in (1.93 m)	—	Fr	Archbishop Ryan High School	Philadelphia, PA
G	3	Zavian McLean	6 ft 4 in (1.93 m)	205 lb (93 kg)	GS	Columbia	Spring Lake, NC
G	5	Xavier Pina	6 ft 3 in (1.91 m)	175 lb (79 kg)	RS Jr	Navarro College	Woodbury, NJ
F	6	Rory Stewart	6 ft 8 in (2.03 m)	230 lb (104 kg)	Jr	Rhode Island	London, England
SG	8	BB Washington	6 ft 5 in (1.96 m)	—	Fr	Christian Academy of Louisville	Houston, TX
F	10	Michael Duax	6 ft 5 in (1.96 m)	215 lb (98 kg)	RS Jr	Northern Iowa	Dubuque, IA
F	12	Evan Barlow	6 ft 4 in (1.93 m)	—	Fr	Morton High School	Morton, IL
G	13	Cameron Codio	6 ft 3 in (1.91 m)	—	Fr	Bishop Moore High School	Winter Garden, FL
F	15	Blaise Vespe	6 ft 7 in (2.01 m)	220 lb (100 kg)	Jr	IMG Academy	Cherry Hill, NJ
C	21	Tristen Guillouette	6 ft 10 in (2.08 m)	—	Fr	George School	Willingboro, NJ
G	23	Dallion Johnson	6 ft 3 in (1.91 m)	185 lb (84 kg)	Sr	Phillips Academy	Boston, MA
G/F	24	Jevin Muniz	6 ft 6 in (1.98 m)	—	Jr	Delaware State	Bethlehem, PA
G	31	Brandon Dwyer	6 ft 3 in (1.91 m)	180 lb (82 kg)	Sr	La Salle	Newark, DE
F	32	Keeshawn Kellman	6 ft 8 in (2.03 m)	225 lb (102 kg)	GS	Princeton	Allentown, PA
F	44	Kyle Riemenschneider	6 ft 5 in (1.96 m)	205 lb (93 kg)	GS	Fort Myers High School	Fort Myers, FL

Head coach

- Pat Chambers (Philadelphia)

Assistant coach(es)

- Kyle Griffin (Siena)
- Kevin Hudash (Penn State)
- David Caporaletti (Philadelphia)
- Shep Garner (Penn State)

Legend

- (C) Team captain
- (S) Suspended
- (I) Ineligible
- (W) Walk-on
- Injured
- Current redshirt

Roster
Last update: October 19, 2024

== Schedule and results ==
Date time, TV	Rank^{#}	Opponent^{#}	Result	Record	Site (attendance) city, state
Exhibition
October 20, 2024*; 4:00 p.m.		at UCF; Charity Exhibition	L 78–92		Addition Financial Arena; Orlando, FL
Non-conference regular season
November 4, 2024*; 7:00 p.m., ESPN+		at UNC Greensboro; SoCon/ASUN Challenge	L 64–73	0–1	First Horizon Coliseum (2,252); Greensboro, NC
November 8, 2024*; 8:00 p.m., ESPN+		at TCU	L 51–67	0–2	Schollmaier Arena (5,026); Fort Worth, TX
November 13, 2024*; 7:00 p.m., ESPN+		St. Bonaventure	L 65–74	0–3	Alico Arena (3,554); Fort Myers, FL
November 16, 2024*; 8:00 p.m., ESPN+		at Drake	L 61–63	0–4	Knapp Center (2,862); Des Moines, IA
November 22, 2024*; 11:00 am, ESPN+		Cal State Bakersfield; Homewood Suites Classic	W 74–54	1–4	Alico Arena (1,388); Fort Myers, FL
November 23, 2024*; 1:00 pm, ESPN+		Northeastern; Homewood Suites Classic	L 55–59	1–5	Alico Arena (1,543); Fort Myers, FL
November 24, 2024*; 3:00 pm, ESPN+		FIU; Homewood Suites Classic	W 60–59	2–5	Alico Arena (1,601); Fort Myers, FL
November 30, 2024*; 6:00 pm, ESPN+		at Florida Atlantic	W 80–78	3–5	Eleanor R. Baldwin Arena (3,161); Boca Raton, FL
December 4, 2024*; 7:00 pm, ESPN+		Furman; SoCon/ASUN Challenge	L 73–76	3–6	Alico Arena (1,908); Fort Myers, FL
December 8, 2024*; 3:00 pm, SECN+		at LSU	L 71–80	3–7	Pete Maravich Assembly Center (7,156); Baton Rouge, LA
December 18, 2024*; 7:00 pm, FloSports		at UNC Wilmington	L 66–79	3–8	Trask Coliseum (4,474); Wilmington, NC
December 22, 2024*; 1:00 pm, ESPN+		Florida Tech	W 79–62	4–8	Alico Arena (1,454); Fort Myers, FL
December 28, 2024*; 6:00 pm, ESPN+		at Richmond	W 75–57	5–8	Robins Center (5,457); Richmond, VA
ASUN regular season
January 2, 2025; 7:00 pm, ESPN+		at West Georgia	W 79–68	6–8 (1–0)	The Coliseum (307); Carrollton, GA
January 4, 2025; 1:00 pm, ESPN+		at Queens	L 83–92	6–9 (1–1)	Curry Arena (472); Charlotte, NC
January 9, 2025; 7:00 pm, ESPN+		North Alabama	W 75–70	7–9 (2–1)	Alico Arena (2,009); Fort Myers, FL
January 11, 2025; 2:00 pm, ESPN+		Central Arkansas	W 77–71	8–9 (3–1)	Alico Arena (1,990); Fort Myers, FL
January 16, 2025; 6:30 pm, ESPN+		West Georgia	W 82–60	9–9 (4–1)	Alico Arena (1,954); Fort Myers, FL
January 18, 2025; 2:00 pm, ESPN+		Queens	W 60–47	10–9 (5–1)	Alico Arena (2,154); Fort Myers, FL
January 23, 2025; 6:30 pm, ESPN+		at Bellarmine	W 77–61	11–9 (6–1)	Knights Hall (1,381); Louisville, KY
January 25, 2025; 4:00 pm, ESPN+		at Eastern Kentucky	L 77–81	11–10 (6–2)	Baptist Health Arena (2,761); Richmond, KY
January 29, 2025; 7:00 pm, ESPN+		at Jacksonville	W 83–79	12–10 (7–2)	Swisher Gymnasium (1,000); Jacksonville, FL
February 1, 2025; 1:00 pm, ESPN+		Stetson	W 82–56	13–10 (8–2)	Alico Arena (3,570); Fort Myers, FL
February 6, 2025; 7:00 pm, ESPN+		Eastern Kentucky	L 74–92	13–11 (8–3)	Alico Arena (2,632); Fort Myers, FL
February 8, 2025; 5:00 pm, ESPN+		at North Florida	W 84–70	14–11 (9–3)	UNF Arena (2,662); Jacksonville, FL
February 13, 2025; 8:00 pm, ESPN+		at Austin Peay	L 60–73	14–12 (9–4)	F&M Bank Arena (1,672); Clarksville, TN
February 15, 2025; 5:00 pm, ESPN+		at Lipscomb	L 68–82	14–13 (9–5)	Allen Arena (2,231); Nashville, TN
February 18, 2025; 6:30 pm, ESPN+		Jacksonville	W 72–56	15–13 (10–5)	Alico Arena (2,220); Fort Myers, FL
February 20, 2025; 7:00 pm, ESPN+		at Stetson	W 83–80	16–13 (11–5)	Insight Credit Union Arena (783); DeLand, FL
February 24, 2025; 7:00 pm, ESPN+		North Florida	W 86–82	17–13 (12–5)	Alico Arena (2,296); Fort Myers, FL
February 26, 2025; 7:00 pm, ESPN+		Bellarmine	W 80–61	18–13 (13–5)	Alico Arena (2,190); Fort Myers, FL
ASUN tournament
March 3, 2025; 7:00 pm, ESPN+	(3)	(6) Queens; Quarterfinals	L 65–71	18–14	Alico Arena (2,423); Fort Myers, FL
CBI
March 24, 2025; 2:00 pm, FloSports		vs. Army; Quarterfinals	W 68–65	19–14	Ocean Center (832); Daytona Beach, FL
March 25, 2025; 9:00 pm, ESPNU		vs. Cleveland State; Semifinals	L 65–72	19–15	Ocean Center (632); Daytona Beach, FL
*Non-conference game. ^{#}Rankings from AP Poll. (#) Tournament seedings in parentheses. All times are in Eastern.
