= 2024–25 North Florida Ospreys men's basketball team =

American college basketball season

2024–25 North Florida Ospreys men's basketball
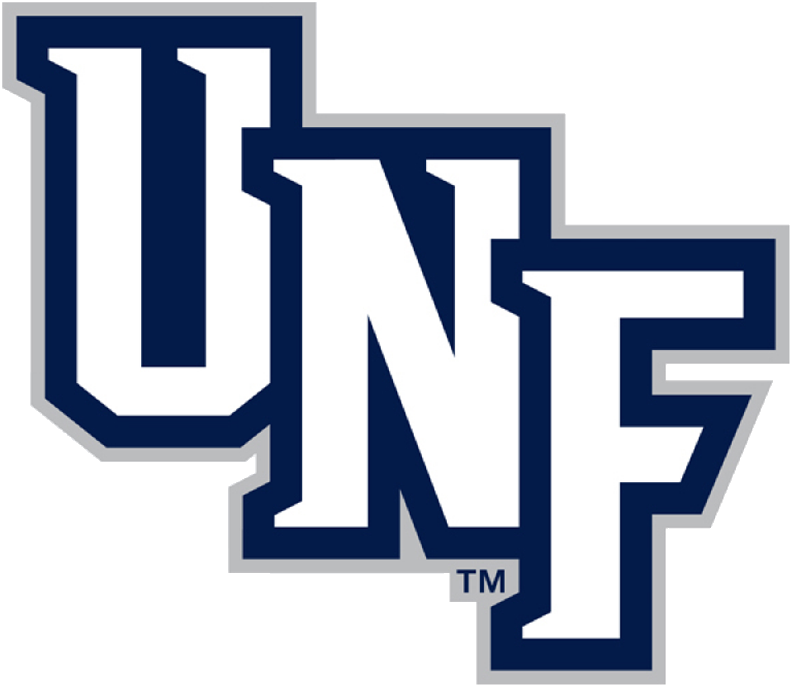
- Conference: Atlantic Sun Conference
- Record: 15–17 (8–10 ASUN)
- Head coach: Matthew Driscoll (16th season)
- Associate head coach: Bobby Kennen
- Assistant coaches: Bruce Evans; Stephen Perkins; Donnie Holland; Chase Driscoll
- Home arena: UNF Arena

2024–25 ASUN men's basketball standings
	Conf.				Overall
Team	W		L	PCT	W		L	PCT
Lipscomb †	14	–	4	.778	25	–	10	.714
North Alabama	14	–	4	.778	24	–	11	.686
Florida Gulf Coast	13	–	5	.722	19	–	15	.559
Jacksonville	12	–	6	.667	19	–	14	.576
Eastern Kentucky	12	–	6	.667	18	–	14	.563
Queens*	11	–	7	.611	20	–	15	.571
Austin Peay	8	–	10	.444	14	–	19	.424
North Florida	8	–	10	.444	15	–	17	.469
Stetson	6	–	12	.333	8	–	24	.250
Central Arkansas	4	–	14	.222	9	–	24	.273
West Georgia*	4	–	14	.222	6	–	25	.194
Bellarmine	2	–	16	.111	5	–	26	.161
† 2025 ASUN tournament winner * ineligible for the 2025 NCAA tournament due to transition from Division II

The 2024–25 North Florida Ospreys men's basketball team represented the University of North Florida during the 2024–25 NCAA Division I men's basketball season. The Ospreys, led by 16th-year head coach Matthew Driscoll, played their home games at the UNF Arena in Jacksonville, Florida as members of the Atlantic Sun Conference.

== Previous season ==
The Ospreys finished the 2023–24 season 16–16, 9–7 in ASUN play to finish in fifth place. They were defeated by Austin Peay in the quarterfinals of the ASUN tournament.

== Roster ==
2024–25 North Florida Ospreys men's basketball team
Players
Coaches

Pos.	#	Name	Height	Weight	Year	Previous school	Hometown
G	0	Jasai Miles	6 ft 6 in (1.98 m)	205 lb (93 kg)	So	Miami Country Day School	Miami, Florida
G	1	Taylor Thompson	6 ft 2 in (1.88 m)	165 lb (75 kg)	Fr	Impact Christian Academy	Jacksonville, Florida
G	2	Nate Lliteras	6 ft 6 in (1.98 m)	215 lb (98 kg)	Sr	Longwood	Seward, Nebraska
G	3	Mason Lee	6 ft 7 in (2.01 m)	185 lb (84 kg)	RS Fr	Providence School	Jacksonville Beach, Florida
G	4	Jaylen Smith	5 ft 11 in (1.8 m)	175 lb (79 kg)	So	West Oaks Academy	Ocoee, Florida
G	5	Dante Oliver	6 ft 5 in (1.96 m)	185 lb (84 kg)	Fr	IMG Academy	Knoxville, Tennessee
F	7	Liam Murphy	6 ft 7 in (2.01 m)	220 lb (100 kg)	GS	Columbia	Staten Island, New York
F	10	Josh Harris	6 ft 8 in (2.03 m)	210 lb (95 kg)	Fr	Pembroke Pines Charter HS	Pembroke Pines, Florida
G	11	Kamrin Oriol	6 ft 3 in (1.91 m)	180 lb (82 kg)	Jr	The Master's	St. Petersburg, Florida
F	12	Arden Begaj	7 ft 0 in (2.13 m)	210 lb (95 kg)	Fr	Bill Crothers Secondary School	Toronto, Canada
G	13	Alex Vargo	6 ft 6 in (1.98 m)	205 lb (93 kg)	RS So	Garrett College	Wheeling, West Virginia
F	24	Nestor Dyachok	6 ft 9 in (2.06 m)	210 lb (95 kg)	Sr	Southern Utah	Moscow, Russia
G	33	Oscar Berry	6 ft 5 in (1.96 m)	200 lb (91 kg)	Sr	Fairleigh Dickinson	Melbourne, Australia
G	55	Ametri Moss	6 ft 0 in (1.83 m)	170 lb (77 kg)	Sr	State College of Florida	Clarksville, Tennessee

Head coach

- Matthew Driscoll (Slippery Rock)

Assistant coach(es)

- Bobby Kennen (Palm Beach Atlantic)
- Bruce Evans (Furman)
- Stephen Perkins (Baylor)
- Donnie Holland (Campbell)
- Chase Driscoll (North Florida)

Legend

- (C) Team captain
- (S) Suspended
- (I) Ineligible
- (W) Walk-on
- Injured
- Current redshirt

Roster
Last update: October 21, 2024

== Schedule and results ==
Date time, TV	Rank^{#}	Opponent^{#}	Result	Record	Site (attendance) city, state
Non-conference regular season
November 4, 2024*; 7:00 pm, SECN+		at South Carolina	W 74–71	1–0	Colonial Life Arena (12,388); Columbia, SC
November 7, 2024*; 7:00 pm, ESPN+		Charleston Southern	W 90–66	2–0	UNF Arena (2,019); Jacksonville, FL
November 10, 2024*; 1:00 pm, ACCNX/ESPN+		at Georgia Tech	W 105–93	3–0	McCamish Pavilion (3,553); Atlanta, GA
November 12, 2024*; 7:00 pm, SECN+		at Georgia; Peach State Classic	L 77–90	3–1	Stegeman Coliseum (5,757); Athens, GA
November 18, 2024*; 7:00 pm, ESPN+		UNC Asheville	L 75–89	3–2	UNF Arena (1,994); Jacksonville, FL
November 21, 2024*; 7:00 pm, ESPN+		Edward Waters	W 108–59	4–2	UNF Arena (1,929); Jacksonville, FL
November 29, 2024*; 7:00 pm, ESPN+		at SIU Edwardsville	W 78–73	5–2	First Community Arena (1,058); Edwardsville, IL
December 1, 2024*; 4:00 pm, BTN		at Nebraska	L 72–103	5–3	Pinnacle Bank Arena (15,359); Lincoln, NE
December 5, 2024*; 7:00 pm, ESPN+		Warner	W 115–83	6–3	UNF Arena (1,189); Jacksonville, FL
December 7, 2024*; 7:00 pm, ESPN+		at Georgia Southern	L 91–93 ^{OT}	6–4	Hill Convocation Center (2,838); Statesboro, GA
December 14, 2024*; 5:00 pm, ESPN+		UNC Greensboro; SoCon/ASUN Challenge	W 89–77	7–4	UNF Arena (1,349); Jacksonville, FL
December 17, 2024*; 7:00 pm, ESPN+		at UNC Asheville	L 81–95	7–5	Kimmel Arena (679); Asheville, NC
December 21, 2024*; 12:00 pm, SECN		at No. 7 Florida	L 45–99	7–6	O'Connell Center (10,109); Gainesville, FL
ASUN regular season
January 2, 2025; 2:00 pm, ESPN+		Austin Peay	L 89–97	7–7 (0–1)	UNF Arena (1,084); Jacksonville, FL
January 4, 2025; 2:00 pm, ESPN+		Lipscomb	L 64–96	7–8 (0–2)	UNF Arena (1,439); Jacksonville, FL
January 9, 2025; 7:00 pm, ESPN+		at Eastern Kentucky	L 74–79	7–9 (0–3)	Baptist Health Arena (1,706); Richmond, KY
January 11, 2025; 6:30 pm, ESPN+		at Bellarmine	W 98–83	8–9 (1–3)	Knights Hall (1,372); Louisville, KY
January 16, 2025; 7:00 pm, ESPN+		Central Arkansas	W 92–80	9–9 (2–3)	UNF Arena (1,768); Jacksonville, FL
January 18, 2025; 2:00 pm, ESPN+		North Alabama	L 84–90	9–10 (2–4)	UNF Arena (1,318); Jacksonville, FL
January 23, 2025; 7:00 pm, ESPN+		at Queens	W 90–81	10–10 (3–4)	Curry Arena (796); Charlotte, NC
January 25, 2025; 2:00 pm, ESPN+		at West Georgia	L 72–92	10–11 (3–5)	The Coliseum (868); Carrollton, GA
January 29, 2025; 7:00 pm, ESPN+		Stetson	W 101–100 ^{OT}	11–11 (4–5)	UNF Arena (1389); Jacksonville, FL
February 1, 2025; 6:00 pm, ESPN+		at Jacksonville	W 81–78	12–11 (5–5)	Swisher Gymnasium (1,000); Jacksonville, FL
February 6, 2025; 8:00 pm, ESPN+		Bellarmine	W 95–88	13–11 (6–5)	UNF Arena (1,286); Jacksonville, FL
February 8, 2025; 5:00 pm, ESPN+		Florida Gulf Coast	L 70–84	13–12 (6–6)	UNF Arena (2,662); Jacksonville, FL
February 13, 2025; 7:00 pm, ESPN+		at North Alabama	L 70–83	13–13 (6–7)	CB&S Bank Arena (2,391); Florence, AL
February 15, 2025; 12:00 pm, ESPN+		at Central Arkansas	L 83–84 ^{OT}	13–14 (6–8)	Farris Center (736); Conway, AR
February 18, 2025; 7:00 pm, ESPN+		at Stetson	W 79–71	14–14 (7–8)	Insight Credit Union Arena (657); DeLand, FL
February 20, 2025; 8:00 pm, ESPN+		Jacksonville	W 77–73	15–14 (8–8)	UNF Arena (3,279); Jacksonville, FL
February 24, 2025; 7:00 pm, ESPN+		at Florida Gulf Coast	L 82–86	15–15 (8–9)	Alico Arena (2,296); Fort Myers, FL
February 26, 2025; 7:00 pm, ESPN+		Eastern Kentucky	L 81–86	15–16 (8–10)	UNF Arena (1,497); Jacksonville, FL
ASUN tournament
March 2, 2025; 7:00 pm, ESPN+	(8)	vs. (7) Austin Peay; First round	L 69–90	15–17	CB&S Bank Arena (147); Florence, AL
*Non-conference game. ^{#}Rankings from AP Poll. (#) Tournament seedings in parentheses. All times are in Eastern.
