= 2024–25 Jacksonville Dolphins men's basketball team =

American college basketball season

2024–25 Jacksonville Dolphins men's basketball
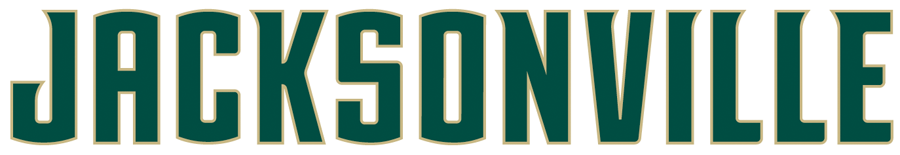

CBI, Quarterfinals
- Conference: Atlantic Sun Conference
- Record: 19–14 (12–6 ASUN)
- Head coach: Jordan Mincy (4th season)
- Associate head coach: Michael Fly
- Assistant coaches: Troy Pierce; Mychal Covington; Stuckey Mosley
- Home arena: Swisher Gymnasium

2024–25 ASUN men's basketball standings
	Conf.				Overall
Team	W		L	PCT	W		L	PCT
Lipscomb †	14	–	4	.778	25	–	10	.714
North Alabama	14	–	4	.778	24	–	11	.686
Florida Gulf Coast	13	–	5	.722	19	–	15	.559
Jacksonville	12	–	6	.667	19	–	14	.576
Eastern Kentucky	12	–	6	.667	18	–	14	.563
Queens*	11	–	7	.611	20	–	15	.571
Austin Peay	8	–	10	.444	14	–	19	.424
North Florida	8	–	10	.444	15	–	17	.469
Stetson	6	–	12	.333	8	–	24	.250
Central Arkansas	4	–	14	.222	9	–	24	.273
West Georgia*	4	–	14	.222	6	–	25	.194
Bellarmine	2	–	16	.111	5	–	26	.161
† 2025 ASUN tournament winner * ineligible for the 2025 NCAA tournament due to transition from Division II

The 2024–25 Jacksonville Dolphins men's basketball team represented Jacksonville University during the 2024–25 NCAA Division I men's basketball season. The Dolphins, led by fourth-year head coach Jordan Mincy, played their home games at Swisher Gymnasium located in Jacksonville, Florida as members of the Atlantic Sun Conference.

== Previous season ==
The Dolphins finished the 2023–24 season 16–17, 5–11 in ASUN play to finish in a tie for tenth place. They defeated Kennesaw State, and upset top-seeded Eastern Kentucky, before falling to eventual tournament champions Stetson in the semifinals of the ASUN tournament.

== Roster ==
2024–25 Jacksonville Dolphins men's basketball team
Players
Coaches

Pos.	#	Name	Height	Weight	Year	Previous school	Hometown
F	0	Stephon Payne III	6 ft 9 in (2.06 m)	220 lb (100 kg)	Jr	Incarnate Word	Jacksonville, Florida
G	1	Chris Arias	6 ft 6 in (1.98 m)	205 lb (93 kg)	Fr	Providence School	Jacksonville, Florida
G	2	Marcus Niblack	6 ft 2 in (1.88 m)	190 lb (86 kg)	Sr	Northwest Florida State	Leesburg, Florida
G	4	Anakin Brown	6 ft 3 in (1.91 m)	170 lb (77 kg)	Fr	Beachside High School	Jacksonville, Florida
G	5	Zach Bell	6 ft 2 in (1.88 m)	180 lb (82 kg)	Jr	Chipola College	Barnwell, South Carolina
G	6	Lamont Jackson	6 ft 2 in (1.88 m)	165 lb (75 kg)	Fr	C.A. Johnson High School	Columbia, South Carolina
G	8	Jakari Spence	6 ft 0 in (1.83 m)	185 lb (84 kg)	GS	Robert Morris	Toms River, New Jersey
F	9	Kendall Munson	6 ft 9 in (2.06 m)	235 lb (107 kg)	Sr	Portland State	Seattle, Washington
G	10	Simon Wheeler	5 ft 10 in (1.78 m)	165 lb (75 kg)	Jr	Ashland	Detroit, Michigan
G	11	Kent Jackson	6 ft 3 in (1.91 m)	176 lb (80 kg)	Fr	Episcopal School of Jacksonville	Jacksonville, Florida
G	13	Robert McCray V	6 ft 4 in (1.93 m)	186 lb (84 kg)	Jr	Wake Forest	Columbia, South Carolina
F	14	Ethan Villanueva	6 ft 3 in (1.91 m)	180 lb (82 kg)	Fr	IMG Academy	Brandon, Florida
F	15	Tito Deng	6 ft 11 in (2.11 m)	207 lb (94 kg)	So	CBA Academy	Warrap, South Sudan
F	16	Zimi Nwokeji	6 ft 7 in (2.01 m)	210 lb (95 kg)	Sr	Dayton	Quincy, Florida
F	23	Enrico Borio	6 ft 8 in (2.03 m)	225 lb (102 kg)	Fr	North Broward Prep	Curitiba, Brazil
F	33	Donovan Rivers	6 ft 9 in (2.06 m)	220 lb (100 kg)	So	TSF Academy	Columbia, South Carolina
G	34	Maximus Fuentes	6 ft 3 in (1.91 m)	190 lb (86 kg)	Jr	Drexel	Miami, Florida

Head coach

- Jordan Mincy (Kent State)

Assistant coach(es)

- Michael Fly (Kentucky)
- Troy Pierce (Emporia State)
- Mychal Covington (Oakland)
- Stuckey Mosley (James Madison)

Legend

- (C) Team captain
- (S) Suspended
- (I) Ineligible
- (W) Walk-on
- Injured
- Current redshirt

Roster
Last update: October 20, 2024

== Schedule and results ==
Date time, TV	Rank^{#}	Opponent^{#}	Result	Record	Site (attendance) city, state
Non-conference regular season
November 4, 2024*; 7:00 pm, ESPN+		Trinity Baptist	W 78–65	1–0	Swisher Gymnasium (718); Jacksonville, FL
November 7, 2024*; 8:00 pm, SECN+		at No. 21 Florida	L 60–81	1–1	O'Connell Center (8,381); Gainesville, FL
November 11, 2024*; 7:00 pm, ESPN+		at Furman; ASUN/SoCon Alliance	L 69–78	1–2	Bon Secours Wellness Arena (2,007); Greenville, SC
November 14, 2024*; 7:00 pm, ESPN+		South Carolina State	W 71–62	2–2	Swisher Gymnasium (1,500); Jacksonville, FL
November 20, 2024*; 7:00 pm, ACCNX		at Virginia Tech; Fort Myers Tip-Off campus game	W 74–64	3–2	Cassell Coliseum (4,441); Blacksburg, VA
November 25, 2024*; 1:30 pm		vs. Mercer; Fort Myers Tip-Off Palms Semifinals	L 89–90 ^{OT}	3–3	Suncoast Credit Union Arena (592); Fort Myers, FL
November 26, 2024*; 11:00 am		vs. Siena; Fort Myers Tip-Off Palms consolation game	W 75–64	4–3	Suncoast Credit Union Arena (350); Fort Myers, FL
November 30, 2024*; 7:00 pm, SECN+/ESPN+		at Georgia	L 56–102	4–4	Stegeman Coliseum (6,285); Athens, GA
December 5, 2024*; 7:00 pm, ESPN+		Florida Tech	W 88–67	5–4	Swisher Gymnasium (1,000); Jacksonville, FL
December 10, 2024*; 7:00 pm, ESPN+		at Florida Atlantic	L 63–85	5–5	Eleanor R. Baldwin Arena (3,161); Boca Raton, FL
December 14, 2024*; 3:00 pm, ESPN+		East Tennessee State; ASUN/SoCon Alliance	W 60–52	6–5	Swisher Gymnasium (1,000); Jacksonville, FL
December 21, 2024*; 6:00 pm, ESPN+		at UCF	L 66–86	6–6	Addition Financial Arena (6,155); Orlando, FL
ASUN regular season
January 2, 2025; 7:00 pm, ESPN+		Lipscomb	L 65–70	6–7 (0–1)	Swisher Gymnasium (1,000); Jacksonville, FL
January 4, 2025; 3:00 pm, ESPN+		Austin Peay	W 68–44	7–7 (1–1)	Swisher Gymnasium (1,000); Jacksonville, FL
January 9, 2025; 6:30 pm, ESPN+		at Bellarmine	W 74–59	8–7 (2–1)	Knights Hall (1,491); Louisville, KY
January 11, 2025; 4:00 pm, ESPN+		at Eastern Kentucky	W 82–75	9–7 (3–1)	Baptist Health Arena (1,872); Richmond, KY
January 16, 2025; 7:00 pm, ESPN+		North Alabama	W 64–60	10–7 (4–1)	Swisher Gymnasium (1,000); Jacksonville, FL
January 18, 2025; 3:00 pm, ESPN+		Central Arkansas	W 72–62	11–7 (5–1)	Swisher Gymnasium (1,012); Jacksonville, FL
January 23, 2025; 12:00 pm, ESPN+		at West Georgia	W 79–62	12–7 (6–1)	The Coliseum (947); Carrollton, GA
January 25, 2025; 1:00 pm, ESPN+		at Queens	W 87–77	13–7 (7–1)	Curry Arena (864); Charlotte, NC
January 29, 2025; 7:00 pm, ESPN+		Florida Gulf Coast	L 79–83	13–8 (7–2)	Swisher Gymnasium (1,000); Jacksonville, FL
February 1, 2025; 6:00 pm, ESPN+		North Florida	L 78–81	13–9 (7–3)	Swisher Gymnasium (1,000); Jacksonville, FL
February 6, 2025; 7:00 pm, ESPN+		at Stetson	W 74–65	14–9 (8–3)	Insight Credit Union Arena (433); DeLand, FL
February 8, 2025; 7:00 pm, ESPN+		Bellarmine	W 73–64	15–9 (9–3)	Swisher Gymnasium (700); Jacksonville, FL
February 13, 2025; 6:30 pm, ESPN+		at Central Arkansas	W 77–62	16–9 (10–3)	Farris Center (657); Conway, AR
February 15, 2025; 12:00 pm, ESPN+		at North Alabama	L 79–92	16–10 (10–4)	CB&S Bank Arena (2,939); Florence, AL
February 18, 2025; 6:30 pm, ESPN+		at Florida Gulf Coast	L 56–72	16–11 (10–5)	Alico Arena (2,220); Fort Myers, FL
February 20, 2025; 8:00 pm, ESPN+		at North Florida	L 73–77	16–12 (10–6)	UNF Arena (3,279); Jacksonville, FL
February 24, 2025; 7:00 pm, ESPN+		Eastern Kentucky	W 59–55	17–12 (11–6)	Swisher Gymnasium (763); Jacksonville, FL
February 26, 2025; 7:00 pm, ESPN+		Stetson	W 79–72	18–12 (12–6)	Swisher Gymnasium (100); Jacksonville, FL
ASUN tournament
March 3, 2025; 7:00 pm, ESPN+	(4)	(5) Eastern Kentucky; Quarterfinals	W 78–67	19–12	Swisher Gymnasium (1,000); Jacksonville, FL
March 6, 2025; 7:00 pm, ESPN+	(4)	at (2) North Alabama; Semifinals	L 63–78	19–13	CB&S Bank Arena (3,000); Florence, AL
CBI
March 24, 2025; 12:00 pm, FloSports		vs. Incarnate Word; Quarterfinals	L 71–87	19–14	Ocean Center; Daytona Beach, FL
*Non-conference game. ^{#}Rankings from AP Poll. (#) Tournament seedings in parentheses. All times are in Eastern.
