= 2024–25 Central Arkansas Bears basketball team =

American college basketball season

2024–25 Central Arkansas Bears basketball
- Conference: Atlantic Sun Conference
- Record: 9–24 (4–14 ASUN)
- Head coach: John Shulman (1st season)
- Associate head coach: Brock Widders
- Assistant coaches: Max Shulman; Ezra Pinzur; Ryan Montgomery
- Home arena: Farris Center

2024–25 ASUN men's basketball standings
	Conf.				Overall
Team	W		L	PCT	W		L	PCT
Lipscomb †	14	–	4	.778	25	–	10	.714
North Alabama	14	–	4	.778	24	–	11	.686
Florida Gulf Coast	13	–	5	.722	19	–	15	.559
Jacksonville	12	–	6	.667	19	–	14	.576
Eastern Kentucky	12	–	6	.667	18	–	14	.563
Queens*	11	–	7	.611	20	–	15	.571
Austin Peay	8	–	10	.444	14	–	19	.424
North Florida	8	–	10	.444	15	–	17	.469
Stetson	6	–	12	.333	8	–	24	.250
Central Arkansas	4	–	14	.222	9	–	24	.273
West Georgia*	4	–	14	.222	6	–	25	.194
Bellarmine	2	–	16	.111	5	–	26	.161
† 2025 ASUN tournament winner * ineligible for the 2025 NCAA tournament due to transition from Division II

The 2024–25 Central Arkansas Bears basketball team represented the University of Central Arkansas during the 2024–25 NCAA Division I men's basketball season. The Bears, led by first-year head coach John Shulman, played their home games at the Farris Center in Conway, Arkansas as members of the Atlantic Sun Conference.

== Previous season ==
The Bears finished the 2023–24 season 9–23, 5–11 in ASUN play to finish in 11th place. They failed to qualify for the ASUN tournament, as only the top ten team qualify.

On March 2, 2024, the school announced that they would be relieving head coach Anthony Boone of his duties, after four seasons at the helm. On March 18, the school announced the hiring of former Alabama–Huntsville head coach John Shulman as the team's next head coach.

== Roster ==
2024–25 Central Arkansas Bears men's basketball team
Players
Coaches

Pos.	#	Name	Height	Weight	Year	Previous school	Hometown
F	0	Glory Etim	6 ft 9 in (2.06 m)	230 lb (104 kg)	Jr	Bowling Green	Richmond, California
F	1	Jabari West Jr.	6 ft 8 in (2.03 m)	230 lb (104 kg)	So	South Plains College	Hot Springs, Arkansas
G	2	Javion Guy-King	6 ft 6 in (1.98 m)	205 lb (93 kg)	So	Sunrise Christian Academy	Little Rock, Arkansas
G	3	Brayden Fagbemi	6 ft 0 in (1.83 m)	170 lb (77 kg)	So	Johns Hopkins	Naperville, Illinois
F	4	Nehemiah Turner	6 ft 10 in (2.08 m)	265 lb (120 kg)	Fr	Auburndale High School	Auburndale, Florida
G/F	5	Tyler Lee	6 ft 5 in (1.96 m)	205 lb (93 kg)	Fr	Fulton High School	Chicago, Illinois
G	8	J.D. Roberts	6 ft 6 in (1.98 m)	200 lb (91 kg)	So	Link Year Prep	Kansas City, Missouri
G	10	Owen Dehrmann	6 ft 4 in (1.93 m)	185 lb (84 kg)	Fr	Bentonville High School	Bentonville, Arkansas
G	11	Connor Mancell	6 ft 2 in (1.88 m)	175 lb (79 kg)	Fr	Briarcrest Christian School	Memphis, Tennessee
G	12	Ty Robinson	6 ft 4 in (1.93 m)	185 lb (84 kg)	Fr	Lake Hamilton High School	Hot Springs, Arkansas
G	13	Ben Fox	6 ft 5 in (1.96 m)	190 lb (86 kg)	So	Little Rock Christian Academy	Little Rock, Arkansas
G	17	Ethan Thomas	6 ft 1 in (1.85 m)	180 lb (82 kg)	Fr	Wilson Central High School	Lebanon, Tennessee
G	22	Michael Evbagharu	6 ft 4 in (1.93 m)	220 lb (100 kg)	So	Siena	Scarborough, Ontario
G/F	23	DJ Seixas	6 ft 8 in (2.03 m)	235 lb (107 kg)	So	San Jose State	Albufeira, Portugal
G/F	24	Cole McCormick	6 ft 6 in (1.98 m)	200 lb (91 kg)	Fr	Notre Dame High School	Chattanooga, Tennessee
G/F	25	Elias Cato	6 ft 9 in (2.06 m)	220 lb (100 kg)	Sr	Sunrise Christian Academy	Queensland, Australia
G	32	Layne Taylor	5 ft 11 in (1.8 m)	185 lb (84 kg)	Fr	Farmington High School	Farmington, Arkansas

Head coach

- John Shulman (East Tennessee St.)

Assistant coach(es)

- Brock Widders (Lyon)
- Max Shulman (Alabama–Huntsville)
- Ezra Pinzur (Tennessee Tech)
- Ryan Montgomery (Lee)

Legend

- (C) Team captain
- (S) Suspended
- (I) Ineligible
- (W) Walk-on
- Injured
- Current redshirt

Roster
Last update: October 18, 2024

== Schedule and results ==
Date time, TV	Rank^{#}	Opponent^{#}	Result	Record	Site (attendance) city, state
Non-conference regular season
November 5, 2024*; 8:00 pm, ESPN+		at BYU	L 50−88	0−1	Marriott Center (16,941); Provo, UT
November 7, 2024*; 9:30 pm, ESPN+		at Utah	L 63−98	0−2	Jon M. Huntsman Center (6,722); Salt Lake City, UT
November 13, 2024*; 6:30 pm, ESPN+		Randall	W 108–49	1–2	Farris Center (1,585); Conway, AR
November 16, 2024*; 1:00 pm, ESPN+		at Western Illinois	L 61–63	1–3	Western Hall (753); Macomb, IL
November 21, 2024*; 6:30 pm, ESPN+		Southeast Missouri State	L 73–77 ^{OT}	1–4	Farris Center (1,311); Conway, AR
November 24, 2024*; 1:00 pm, ESPN+		UNC Asheville	W 92–83 ^{2OT}	2–4	Farris Center (655); Conway, AR
November 30, 2024*; 12:00 pm, ACCN/ESPN+		at Georgia Tech	L 68–87	2–5	McCamish Pavilion (3,414); Atlanta, GA
December 4, 2024*; 7:00 pm, ESPN+		at Little Rock; I-40 Showdown	L 57–63	2–6	Jack Stephens Center (1,247); Little Rock, AR
December 7, 2024*; 6:00 pm		at Arkansas–Pine Bluff	L 78–84	2–7	H.O. Clemmons Arena (2,485); Pine Bluff, AR
December 14, 2024*; 3:00 pm, SECN+/ESPN+		vs. Arkansas	L 57–82	2–8	Simmons Bank Arena (15,535); North Little Rock, AR
December 16, 2024*; 6:30 pm, ESPN+		The Citadel; SoCon/ASUN Challenge	W 73–71	3–8	Farris Center (583); Conway, AR
December 22, 2024*; 12:00 pm, SECN+/ESPN+		at No. 14 Oklahoma	L 66–89	3–9	Lloyd Noble Center (6,244); Norman, OK
December 29, 2024*; 4:00 pm, ESPN+		Southwestern Christian	W 87–69	4–9	Farris Center (495); Conway, AR
ASUN regular season
January 2, 2025; 7:30 pm, ESPN+		Eastern Kentucky	L 83–89 ^{2OT}	4–10 (0–1)	Farris Center (793); Conway, AR
January 4, 2025; 1:00 pm, ESPN+		Bellarmine	W 71–65	5–10 (1–1)	Farris Center (975); Conway, AR
January 9, 2025; 7:00 pm, ESPN+		at Stetson	L 65–75	5–11 (1–2)	Insight Credit Union Arena (515); DeLand, FL
January 11, 2025; 1:00 pm, ESPN+		at Florida Gulf Coast	L 71–77	5–12 (1–3)	Alico Arena (1,990); Fort Myers, FL
January 16, 2025; 6:00 pm, ESPN+		at North Florida	L 80–92	5–13 (1–4)	UNF Arena (1,768); Jacksonville, FL
January 18, 2025; 2:00 pm, ESPN+		at Jacksonville	L 62–72	5–14 (1–5)	Swisher Gymnasium (1,012); Jacksonville, FL
January 23, 2025; 6:30 pm, ESPN+		Austin Peay	L 71–73	5–15 (1–6)	Farris Center (1,625); Conway, AR
January 25, 2025; 1:00 pm, ESPN+		Lipscomb	L 55–68	5–16 (1–7)	Farris Center (1,148); Conway, AR
January 29, 2025; 6:30 pm, ESPN+		West Georgia	W 75–70	6–16 (2–7)	Farris Center (1048); Conway, AR
February 1, 2025; 7:45 pm, ESPN+		at North Alabama	L 65–94	6–17 (2–8)	CB&S Bank Arena (2,392); Florence, AL
February 5, 2025; 6:30 pm, ESPN+		Queens	L 47–63	6–18 (2–9)	Farris Center (815); Conway, AR
February 8, 2025; 4:00 pm, ESPN+		at Austin Peay	L 67–90	6–19 (2–10)	F&M Bank Arena (3,167); Clarksville, TN
February 13, 2025; 6:30 pm, ESPN+		Jacksonville	L 62–77	6–20 (2–11)	Farris Center (657); Conway, AR
February 15, 2025; 3:30 pm, ESPN+		North Florida	W 84–83 ^{OT}	7–20 (3–11)	Farris Center (736); Conway, AR
February 18, 2025; 6:00 pm, ESPN+		at Queens	L 72–89	7–21 (3–12)	Curry Arena (468); Charlotte, NC
February 20, 2025; 6:45 pm, ESPN+		at West Georgia	W 82–71	8–21 (4–12)	The Coliseum (1,537); Carrollton, GA
February 24, 2025; 6:30 pm, ESPN+		North Alabama	L 70–93	8–22 (4–13)	Farris Center (774); Conway, AR
February 26, 2025; 7:00 pm, ESPN+		at Lipscomb	L 60–78	8–23 (4–14)	Allen Arena (1,777); Nashville, TN
ASUN tournament
March 2, 2025; 6:00 pm, ESPN+	(10)	vs. (9) Stetson; First round	W 77–72	9–23	Allen Arena (207); Nashville, TN
March 3, 2025; 7:00 pm, ESPN+	(10)	at (1) Lipscomb; Quarterfinals	L 66–84	9–24	Allen Arena (1,694); Nashville, TN
*Non-conference game. ^{#}Rankings from AP Poll. (#) Tournament seedings in parentheses. All times are in Central.
