= 2024–25 Austin Peay Governors men's basketball team =

American college basketball season

2024–25 Austin Peay Governors men's basketball
- Conference: Atlantic Sun Conference
- Record: 14–19 (8–10 ASUN)
- Head coach: Corey Gipson (2nd season)
- Associate head coach: Rodney Hamilton
- Assistant coaches: Tim Ward; Dugan Lyne; Dewayne Jackson
- Home arena: F&M Bank Arena

2024–25 ASUN men's basketball standings
	Conf.				Overall
Team	W		L	PCT	W		L	PCT
Lipscomb †	14	–	4	.778	25	–	10	.714
North Alabama	14	–	4	.778	24	–	11	.686
Florida Gulf Coast	13	–	5	.722	19	–	15	.559
Jacksonville	12	–	6	.667	19	–	14	.576
Eastern Kentucky	12	–	6	.667	18	–	14	.563
Queens*	11	–	7	.611	20	–	15	.571
Austin Peay	8	–	10	.444	14	–	19	.424
North Florida	8	–	10	.444	15	–	17	.469
Stetson	6	–	12	.333	8	–	24	.250
Central Arkansas	4	–	14	.222	9	–	24	.273
West Georgia*	4	–	14	.222	6	–	25	.194
Bellarmine	2	–	16	.111	5	–	26	.161
† 2025 ASUN tournament winner * ineligible for the 2025 NCAA tournament due to transition from Division II

The 2024–25 Austin Peay Governors men's basketball team represents Austin Peay State University during the 2024–25 NCAA Division I men's basketball season. The Governors, led by second-year head coach Corey Gipson, play their home games at F&M Bank Arena located in Clarksville, Tennessee as members of the Atlantic Sun Conference.

== Previous season ==
The Governors finished the 2023–24 season 19–16, 10–6 in ASUN play to finish in fourth place. They defeated North Florida, and North Alabama, before falling to Stetson in the championship game in the ASUN tournament. They received an invitation to the CIT, where they would fall to Alabama A&M in the quarterfinals.

== Roster ==
2024–25 Austin Peay Governors men's basketball team
Players
Coaches

Pos.	#	Name	Height	Weight	Year	Previous school	Hometown
G/F	0	Tate McCubbin	6 ft 8 in (2.03 m)	174 lb (79 kg)	Fr	Battle HS	Columbia, Missouri
F	1	Sai Witt	6 ft 8 in (2.03 m)	270 lb (122 kg)	GS	Lincoln (MO)	Kansas City, Missouri
G	2	Tekao Carpenter	6 ft 3 in (1.91 m)	190 lb (86 kg)	Jr	Moberly Area CC	Alexandria, Virginia
G	3	Isaac Haney	6 ft 2 in (1.88 m)	191 lb (87 kg)	Sr	Northwestern State	West Plains, Missouri
G	4	LJ Thomas	6 ft 2 in (1.88 m)	199 lb (90 kg)	Jr	NC State	Plant City, Florida
G/F	5	JaVar Daniel	6 ft 10 in (2.08 m)	208 lb (94 kg)	So	We Are United Prep	Memphis, Tennessee
F	6	Daniel Loos	6 ft 6 in (1.98 m)	233 lb (106 kg)	GS	Christian Brothers	Clarksville, Tennessee
G/F	7	Akili Evans	6 ft 5 in (1.96 m)	175 lb (79 kg)	RS Jr	Moberly Area CC	Waterbury, Connecticut
G	10	Terrell Gaines	5 ft 8 in (1.73 m)	155 lb (70 kg)	Fr	Liberty HS	West Plains, Missouri
G	11	Me'Kell Burries	6 ft 3 in (1.91 m)	175 lb (79 kg)	RS Sr	Lincoln Memorial	Newport, Kentucky
G	12	Anton Brookshire	6 ft 2 in (1.88 m)	174 lb (79 kg)	RS Jr	Iona	Milwaukee, Wisconsin
G/F	14	Darius Dawson	6 ft 6 in (1.98 m)	209 lb (95 kg)	Sr	Missouri Southern	Sumter, South Carolina
G	20	Quan Lax	6 ft 2 in (1.88 m)	188 lb (85 kg)	RS Jr	Freed–Hardeman	Bolivar, Tennessee
G/F	22	Bowen Hammer	6 ft 8 in (2.03 m)	—	Fr	Fairmont Prep Academy	Santa Clara, Utah
G	24	Hansel Enmanuel	6 ft 6 in (1.98 m)	167 lb (76 kg)	Jr	Northwestern State	Los Mina, Dominican Republic

Head coach

- Corey Gipson (Austin Peay)

Assistant coach(es)

- Rodney Hamilton (Georgia State)
- Tim Ward (Central Methodist)
- Dugan Lyne (Austin Peay)
- Dewayne Jackson (Columbus State)

Legend

- (C) Team captain
- (S) Suspended
- (I) Ineligible
- (W) Walk-on
- Injured
- Current redshirt

Roster
Last update: October 20, 2024

== Schedule and results ==
Date time, TV	Rank^{#}	Opponent^{#}	Result	Record	Site (attendance) city, state
Exhibition
October 22, 2024*; 6:00 p.m.		at Tennessee Tech; Charity Exhibition	W 90–80	–	Hooper Eblen Center; Cookeville, TN
Non-conference regular season
November 4, 2024*; 7:00 p.m., ESPN+		Union	W 95–75	1–0	F&M Bank Arena (1,644); Clarksville, TN
November 8, 2024*; 5:30 p.m., FS2		at Butler	W 68–66	2–0	Hinkle Fieldhouse (7,193); Indianapolis, IN
November 11, 2024*; 7:00 p.m., ESPN+		Chattanooga; SoCon/ASUN Challenge	W 67–61	3–0	F&M Bank Arena (2,655); Clarksville, TN
November 17, 2024*; 2:00 p.m., SECN+		at No. 11 Tennessee	L 68–103	3–1	Thompson–Boling Arena (17,232); Knoxville, TN
November 20, 2024*; 7:00 pm, ESPN+		at Morehead State	L 58–63	3–2	Ellis Johnson Arena (1,912); Morehead, KY
November 26, 2024*; 1:30 pm, ESPN+		vs. Georgia State; Jacksonville Classic	W 62–50	4–2	FSCJ Gymnasium (148); Jacksonville, FL
November 27, 2024*; 4:00 pm, ESPN+		vs. UT Arlington; Jacksonville Classic	L 58–68	4–3	FSCJ Gymnasium (276); Jacksonville, FL
November 30, 2024*; 3:00 pm, ESPN+		at East Tennessee State	L 57–79	4–4	Freedom Hall Civic Center (3,467); Johnson City, TN
December 8, 2024*; 2:00 pm, ESPN+		at Samford; SoCon/ASUN Challenge	L 47–72	4–5	Pete Hanna Center (1,337); Homewood, AL
December 14, 2024*; 4:00 pm, ESPN+		Southern Illinois	L 60–65	4–6	F&M Bank Arena (1,727); Clarksville, TN
December 18, 2024*; 6:00 pm, ESPN+		at Ohio	L 58–78	4–7	Convocation Center (3,065); Athens, OH
December 21, 2024*; 2:00 pm, SECN+		at Vanderbilt	L 55–85	4–8	Memorial Gymnasium (7,230); Nashville, TN
December 29, 2024*; 4:00 pm, ESPN+		Brescia	W 93–46	5–8	F&M Bank Arena (1,326); Clarksville, TN
ASUN regular season
January 2, 2025; 1:00 pm, ESPN+		at North Florida	W 97–89	6–8 (1–0)	UNF Arena (1,084); Jacksonville, FL
January 4, 2025; 2:00 pm, ESPN+		at Jacksonville	L 44–68	6–9 (1–1)	Swisher Gymnasium (1,000); Jacksonville, FL
January 9, 2025; 7:00 pm, ESPN+		West Georgia	L 68–72	6–10 (1–2)	F&M Bank Arena (2,216); Clarksville, TN
January 11, 2025; 4:00 pm, ESPN+		Queens	L 60–67	6–11 (1–3)	F&M Bank Arena (1,137); Clarksville, TN
January 16, 2025; 7:00 pm, ESPN+		Eastern Kentucky	W 97–90 ^{OT}	7–11 (2–3)	F&M Bank Arena (1,326); Clarksville, TN
January 18, 2025; 6:00 pm, ESPN+		at Lipscomb	L 60–88	7–12 (2–4)	Allen Arena (2,375); Nashville, TN
January 23, 2025; 6:30 pm, ESPN+		at Central Arkansas	W 73–71	8–12 (3–4)	Farris Center (1,625); Conway, AR
January 25, 2025; 6:00 pm, ESPN+		at North Alabama	L 84–88 ^{OT}	8–13 (3–5)	CB&S Bank Arena (3,000); Florence, AL
January 30, 2025; 7:00 pm, ESPN+		Bellarmine	W 86–77 ^{OT}	9–13 (4–5)	F&M Bank Arena (1257); Clarksville, TN
February 1, 2025; 3:00 pm, ESPN+		at Eastern Kentucky	L 82–88	9–14 (4–6)	Baptist Health Arena (2,267); Richmond, KY
February 5, 2025; 7:00 pm, ESPN+		North Alabama	L 64–74	9–15 (4–7)	F&M Bank Arena (1,759); Clarksville, TN
February 8, 2025; 4:00 pm, ESPN+		Central Arkansas	W 90–67	10–15 (5–7)	F&M Bank Arena (3,167); Clarksville, TN
February 13, 2025; 7:00 pm, ESPN+		Florida Gulf Coast	W 73–60	11–15 (6–7)	F&M Bank Arena (1,672); Clarksville, TN
February 15, 2025; 4:00 pm, ESPN+		Stetson	W 76–63	12–15 (7–7)	F&M Bank Arena (1,467); Clarksville, TN
February 18, 2025; 5:30 pm, ESPN+		at Bellarmine	L 68–94	12–16 (7–8)	Knights Hall (1,173); Louisville, KY
February 20, 2025; 6:00 pm, ESPN+		at Queens	W 92–78	13–16 (8–8)	Curry Arena (636); Charlotte, NC
February 24, 2025; 6:00 pm, ESPN+		Lipscomb	L 78–95	13–17 (8–9)	F&M Bank Arena (3,029); Clarksville, TN
February 26, 2025; 6:00 pm, ESPN+		at West Georgia	L 70–73	13–18 (8–10)	The Coliseum (1,092); Carrollton, GA
ASUN tournament
March 2, 2025; 6:00 pm, ESPN+	(7)	vs. (8) North Florida; First round	W 90–69	14–18	CB&S Bank Arena (147); Florence, AL
March 3, 2025; 6:00 pm, ESPN+	(7)	at (2) North Alabama; Quarterfinals	L 64–90	14–19	CB&S Bank Arena (3,000); Florence, AL
*Non-conference game. ^{#}Rankings from AP Poll. (#) Tournament seedings in parentheses. All times are in Central.
