= 2024–25 Georgia Tech Yellow Jackets men's basketball team =

American college basketball season

2024–25 Georgia Tech Yellow Jackets men's basketball

NIT, First Round
- Conference: Atlantic Coast Conference
- Record: 17–17 (10–10 ACC)
- Head coach: Damon Stoudamire (2nd season)
- Associate head coach: Karl Hobbs (2nd season)
- Assistant coaches: B. J. Elder (1st season); Pershin Williams (2nd season); Nate Babcock (1st season); Bonzi Wells (1st season)
- Home arena: McCamish Pavilion

2024–25 ACC men's basketball standings
	Conf.				Overall
Team	W		L	PCT	W		L	PCT
No. 3 Duke †	19	–	1	.950	35	–	4	.897
No. 21 Louisville	18	–	2	.900	27	–	8	.771
No. 22 Clemson	18	–	2	.900	27	–	7	.794
Wake Forest	13	–	7	.650	21	–	11	.656
North Carolina	13	–	7	.650	23	–	14	.622
SMU	13	–	7	.650	24	–	11	.686
Stanford	11	–	9	.550	21	–	14	.600
Georgia Tech	10	–	10	.500	17	–	17	.500
Virginia	8	–	12	.400	15	–	17	.469
Virginia Tech	8	–	12	.400	13	–	19	.406
Florida State	8	–	12	.400	17	–	15	.531
Notre Dame	8	–	12	.400	15	–	18	.455
Pittsburgh	8	–	12	.400	17	–	15	.531
Syracuse	7	–	13	.350	14	–	19	.424
California	6	–	14	.300	14	–	19	.424
NC State	5	–	15	.250	12	–	19	.387
Boston College	4	–	16	.200	12	–	19	.387
Miami (FL)	3	–	17	.150	7	–	24	.226
† 2025 ACC tournament winner Rankings from AP poll

The 2024–25 Georgia Tech Yellow Jackets men's basketball team represented the Georgia Institute of Technology during the 2024–25 NCAA Division I men's basketball season. They were led by second-year head coach Damon Stoudamire and played their home games at Hank McCamish Pavilion in Atlanta, Georgia as members of the Atlantic Coast Conference.

The Yellow Jackets started the year with mixed results as they went 2–1 in their first three games. They lost to North Florida while defeating West Georgia and Texas Southern. They then lost a rivalry match against Georgia 77–69. They faced their first ranked team of the season in number eighteen Cincinnati, and lost 81–58. They team rebounded with two wins before facing their next ranked team during the ACC–SEC Challenge. There they lost to twenty-first ranked Oklahoma and followed that with a loss to number twenty North Carolina 68–65. They participated in the Milwaukee Tip-Off where they lost to Northwestern. The Yellow Jackets went 4–1 over their next five games, only losing to fifth-ranked Duke. This stretch also included two wins over ACC foes in Notre Dame and Boston College. The team then went on a four-game losing streak in ACC play. They improved from there going 3–2 over their next fine. They defeated twenty-first ranked Louisville and won a triple-overtime game against Clemson in that stretch. They went 5–2 in their last seven games with their wins coming against Stanford, California, in overtime, Pittsburgh, NC State, and Miami. They lost to Boston College and Wake Forest 69–43 on the final day of the regular season.

The Yellow Jackets finished the season 17–17 and 10–10 in ACC play to finish in eighth place. As the eighth seed in the 2025 ACC tournament faced ninth-seed Virginia in the Second Round. They avenged a regular-season loss to the Cavaliers, and won the tournament game 66–60. They fell to top seed and top ranked Duke 78–70 in the Quarterfinals. They received an at-large bid to the NIT. The Yellow Jackets were a four-seed in the Irvine region. They lost their opening game to Jacksonville State 81–64 to end their season.

== Previous season ==
The Yellow Jackets finished the season 14–18 and 7–13 in ACC play to finish in a tie for twelfth place. As the thirteenth seed in the ACC tournament, they lost to thirteenth seed Notre Dame in the First Round. They were not invited to the NCAA tournament or the NIT.

== Offseason ==
=== Departures ===
Departures
Name	Number	Pos.	Height	Weight	Year	Hometown	Reason for departure
Kyle Sturdivant	1	G	6'3"	195	Senior	Norcross, Georgia	Graduated
Dallan Coleman	3	G	6'6"	210	Junior	Memphis, Tennessee	Transferred to UCF
Carter Murphy	4	G	6'4"	205	Senior	Phoenix, Arizona	Graduated
Tafara Gapare	5	F	6'9"	206	Sophomore	Wellington, New Zealand	Transferred to Maryland
Ebenezer Dowuona	10	F	6'11"	230	Senior	Accra, Ghana	Transferred to James Madison
Tyzhaun Claude	12	F	6'7"	226	Senior	Goldsboro, North Carolina	Transferred to North Carolina
Miles Kelly	13	G	6'6"	180	Junior	Stone Mountain, Georgia	Transferred to Auburn
Ibrahima Sacko	23	F	6'6"	225	Freshman	Conakry, Guinea	Transferred to New Mexico
Amaree Abram	24	G	6'4"	195	Sophomore	Port Arthur, Texas	Transferred to Louisiana Tech

=== Incoming transfers ===
Incoming transfers
Name	Number	Pos.	Height	Weight	Year	Hometown	Previous school
Javian McCollum	2	G	6'2"	190	Senior	Toronto, Canada	Oklahoma
Luke O'Brien	9	F	6'8"	222	Senior	Littleton, Colorado	Colorado
Ryan Mutombo	12	C	7'2"	259	Senior	Atlanta, Georgia	Georgetown

=== Recruiting classes ===
==== 2024 recruiting class ====
College recruiting information
Name	Hometown	School	Height	Weight	Commit date
Jaeden Mustaf; SG	Bowie, Maryland	Overtime Elite	6 ft 4 in (1.93 m)	195 lb (88 kg)	Sep 14, 2023
Jaeden Mustaf; SG	Recruit ratings: Rivals: 247Sports: ESPN: (86)				
Doryan Onwuchekwa; C	DeSoto, Texas	Faith Family Academy (TX)	6 ft 11 in (2.11 m)	235 lb (107 kg)	Mar 19, 2024
Doryan Onwuchekwa; C	Recruit ratings: Rivals: 247Sports: ESPN: (81)				
Darrion Sutton; SF	Atlanta, Georgia	Overtime Elite	6 ft 8 in (2.03 m)	199 lb (90 kg)	Dec 22, 2023
Darrion Sutton; SF	Recruit ratings: Rivals: 247Sports: ESPN: (82)				
Overall recruit ranking:
Note: In many cases, Scout, Rivals, 247Sports, On3, and ESPN may conflict in their listings of height and weight.; In these cases, the average was taken. ESPN grades are on a 100-point scale.; Sources: "2024 Georgia Tech Commits". Rivals.; "Georgia Tech 2024 Basketball Commits". Scout.; "Georgia Tech Yellow Jackets". ESPN.; "Scout.com Team Recruiting Rankings". Scout.; "2024 Team Ranking". Rivals.

== Roster ==
2024–25 Georgia Tech Yellow Jackets men's basketball team
Players
Coaches

Pos.	#	Name	Height	Weight	Year	Previous school	Hometown
G	0	Lance Terry	6 ft 2 in (1.88 m)	198 lb (90 kg)	Sr	The Heritage School; Gardner–Webb	College Park, GA
G	1	Naithan George	6 ft 3 in (1.91 m)	180 lb (82 kg)	So	Dream City Christian School (AZ)	Toronto, ON
G	2	Javian McCollum	6 ft 2 in (1.88 m)	160 lb (73 kg)	Sr	Fort Myers; Oklahoma	Fort Myers, FL
G	3	Jaeden Mustaf	6 ft 5 in (1.96 m)	206 lb (93 kg)	Fr	Overtime Elite	Bowie, MD
F	9	Luke O'Brien	6 ft 8 in (2.03 m)	222 lb (101 kg)	Sr	Columbine; Colorado	Littleton, CO
F	10	Darrion Sutton	6 ft 8 in (2.03 m)	199 lb (90 kg)	Fr	Overtime Elite	St. Charles, MO
F	11	Baye Ndongo	6 ft 9 in (2.06 m)	214 lb (97 kg)	So	Putnam Science Academy (CT)	Mboro, Senegal
C	12	Ryan Mutombo	7 ft 2 in (2.18 m)	259 lb (117 kg)	Sr	The Lovett School	Atlanta, GA
G	14	Kowacie Reeves	6 ft 7 in (2.01 m)	202 lb (92 kg)	Sr	Westside HS; Florida	Macon, GA
F	30	Ibrahim Souare	6 ft 9 in (2.06 m)	214 lb (97 kg)	RS Fr	Dream City Christian School (AZ)	Conakry, Guinea
G	33	Marcos San Miguel (W)	6 ft 4 in (1.93 m)	190 lb (86 kg)	So	Campbell HS	Atlanta, GA
F	35	Emmer Nichols (W)	6 ft 6 in (1.98 m)	215 lb (98 kg)	RS So	Sacred Heart Prep School	Woodside, CA
C	45	Doryan Onwuchekwa	6 ft 11 in (2.11 m)	235 lb (107 kg)	Fr	Faith Family Academy (TX)	DeSoto, TX

Head coach

- Damon Stoudamire (Arizona)

Assistant coach(es)

- Karl Hobbs (Connecticut)
- B. J. Elder (Georgia Tech)
- Pershin Williams (North Florida)
- Nate Babcock (UW–Eau Claire)
- Bonzi Wells (Ball State)

Legend

- (C) Team captain
- (S) Suspended
- (I) Ineligible
- (W) Walk-on
- Injured
- Current redshirt

Roster
Last update: August 5, 2024

== Schedule and results ==
Date time, TV	Rank^{#}	Opponent^{#}	Result	Record	High points	High rebounds	High assists	Site (attendance) city, state
Regular season
November 6, 2024*; 7:30 p.m., ACCNX/ESPN+		West Georgia	W 85–62	1–0	18 – McCollum	10 – O'Brien	7 – George	McCamish Pavilion (3,530); Atlanta, GA
November 10, 2024*; 1:00 p.m., ACCNX/ESPN+		North Florida	L 93–105	1–1	20 – Ndongo	10 – Ndongo	7 – George	McCamish Pavilion (3,553); Atlanta, GA
November 12, 2024*; 7:30 p.m., ACCNX/ESPN+		Texas Southern	W 81–62	2–1	19 – Ndongo	11 – Ndongo	6 – George	McCamish Pavilion (3,384); Atlanta, GA
November 15, 2024*; 8:00 p.m., ACCNX/ESPN+		Georgia; Rivalry	L 69–77	2–2	20 – Terry	11 – Onwuchekwa	3 – Tied	McCamish Pavilion (6,622); Atlanta, GA
November 23, 2024*; 2:00 p.m., ACCNX/ESPN+		No. 18 Cincinnati	L 58–81	2–3	13 – George	6 – Ndongo	3 – Mustaf	McCamish Pavilion (4,970); Atlanta, GA
November 27, 2024*; 7:30 p.m., ACCNX/ESPN+		Charleston Southern	W 91–67	3–3	17 – Tied	8 – Tied	7 – George	McCamish Pavilion (3,414); Atlanta, GA
November 30, 2024*; 1:00 p.m., ACCNX/ESPN+		Central Arkansas	W 87–68	4–3	25 – Terry	9 – Tied	11 – George	McCamish Pavilion (3,414); Atlanta, GA
December 3, 2024*; 9:00 p.m., ESPNU		at No. 21 Oklahoma; ACC–SEC Challenge	L 61–76	4–4	16 – Mustaf	12 – Powell	5 – George	Lloyd Noble Center (7,725); Norman, OK
December 7, 2024; 2:00 p.m., ACCN		at No. 20 North Carolina	L 65–68	4–5 (0–1)	22 – Terry	12 – Ndongo	3 – George	Dean Smith Center (19,020); Chapel Hill, NC
December 15, 2024*; 3:30 p.m., BTN		vs. Northwestern; Milwaukee Tip-Off	L 60–71	4–6	17 – Terry	7 – Tied	7 – George	Fiserv Forum; Milwaukee, WI
December 18, 2024*; 7:30 p.m., ACCNX/ESPN+		UMBC	W 91–82	5–6	18 – George	9 – Ndongo	8 – George	McCamish Pavilion (3,494); Atlanta, GA
December 21, 2024; 12:00 p.m., ACCN		No. 5 Duke	L 56–82	5–7 (0–2)	14 – Ndongo	6 – Mutombo	4 – Tied	McCamish Pavilion (8,005); Atlanta, GA
December 28, 2024*; 12:00 p.m., ACCN		Alabama A&M	W 92–49	6–7	22 – Terry	7 – Tied	9 – George	McCamish Pavilion (4,430); Atlanta, GA
December 31, 2024; 2:30 p.m., ACCN		Notre Dame	W 86–75	7–7 (1–2)	21 – Tied	6 – Ndongo	6 – Tied	McCamish Pavilion (4,914); Atlanta, GA
January 4, 2025; 12:00 p.m., ESPNU		Boston College	W 85–64	8–7 (2–2)	20 – Tied	6 – Souare	10 – George	McCamish Pavilion (3,949); Atlanta, GA
January 7, 2025; 7:00 p.m., ACCN		at Syracuse	L 55–62	8–8 (2–3)	18 – Terry	8 – Ndongo	5 – George	JMA Wireless Dome (13,935); Syracuse, NY
January 11, 2025; 4:00 p.m., ESPN2		at SMU	L 71–93	8–9 (2–4)	20 – McCollum	11 – Powell	10 – George	Moody Coliseum (5,526); Dallas, TX
January 14, 2025; 9:00 p.m., ACCN		Clemson	L 59–70	8–10 (2–5)	14 – Ndongo	12 – Ndongo	5 – McCollum	McCamish Pavilion (4,047); Atlanta, GA
January 18, 2025; 12:00 p.m., ESPNU		at Florida State	L 78–91	8–11 (2–6)	23 – Terry	12 – Ndongo	4 – Tied	Donald L. Tucker Center (6,751); Tallahassee, FL
January 22, 2025; 7:00 p.m., ESPNU		Virginia Tech	W 71–64	9–11 (3–6)	23 – Powell	9 – Ndongo	7 – George	McCamish Pavilion (3,668); Atlanta, GA
January 28, 2025; 9:00 p.m., ACCN		at Notre Dame	L 68–71	9–12 (3–7)	20 – George	7 – Ndongo	5 – George	Joyce Center (4,262); South Bend, IN
February 1, 2025; 3:45 p.m., The CW		No. 21 Louisville	W 77–70	10–12 (4–7)	23 – Terry	11 – Ndongo	9 – George	McCamish Pavilion (6,147); Atlanta, GA
February 4, 2025; 9:00 p.m., ACCN		at Clemson	W 89–86 ^{3OT}	11–12 (5–7)	28 – George	13 – Ndongo	7 – George	Littlejohn Coliseum (7,931); Clemson, SC
February 8, 2025; 5:30 p.m., The CW		at Virginia	L 61–75	11–13 (5–8)	20 – George	6 – George	5 – George	John Paul Jones Arena (14,637); Charlottesville, VA
February 12, 2025; 7:00 p.m., ACCN		Stanford	W 60–52	12–13 (6–8)	22 – George	16 – Ndongo	5 – George	McCamish Pavilion (3,869); Atlanta, GA
February 15, 2025; 4:00 p.m., ACCN		California	W 90–88 ^{OT}	13–13 (7–8)	26 – Tied	13 – Ndongo	8 – George	McCamish Pavilion (4,648); Atlanta, GA
February 22, 2025; 2:00 p.m., ACCN		at Boston College	L 54–69	13–14 (7–9)	17 – Ndongo	15 – Ndongo	6 – George	Conte Forum (6,038); Chestnut Hill, MA
February 25, 2025; 7:00 p.m., ACCN		at Pittsburgh	W 73–67	14–14 (8–9)	26 – Powell	17 – Ndongo	5 – George	Petersen Events Center (6,355); Pittsburgh, PA
March 1, 2025; 3:00 p.m., ACCN		NC State	W 87–62	15–14 (9–9)	29 – Ndongo	17 – Ndongo	12 – George	McCamish Pavilion (4,491); Atlanta, GA
March 4, 2025; 7:00 p.m., ACCN		Miami (FL)	W 89–74	16–14 (10–9)	31 – Terry	8 – Ndongo	11 – George	McCamish Pavilion (4,765); Atlanta, GA
March 8, 2025; 12:00 p.m., The CW		at Wake Forest	L 43–69	16–15 (10–10)	13 – Ndongo	11 – Souare	3 – George	LJVM Coliseum (8,994); Winston-Salem, NC
ACC tournament
March 12, 2025; 12:00 p.m., ESPN	(8)	vs. (9) Virginia; Second round	W 66–60	17–15	21 – Powell	10 – Tied	8 – George	Spectrum Center (9,722); Charlotte, NC
March 13, 2025; 12:00 p.m., ESPN	(8)	vs. (1) No. 1 Duke; Quarterfinals	L 70–78	17–16	24 – Powell	7 – Ndongo	7 – George	Spectrum Center (14,116); Charlotte, NC
NIT
March 18, 2025; 7:00 p.m., ESPN2	(4)	Jacksonville State; First round – Irvine Region	L 64–81	17–17	15 – Tied	5 – Tied	7 – McCollum	McCamish Pavilion (1,623); Atlanta, GA
*Non-conference game. ^{#}Rankings from AP poll. (#) Tournament seedings in parentheses. All times are in Eastern Time.
