= 2024–25 Stetson Hatters men's basketball team =

American college basketball season

2024–25 Stetson Hatters men's basketball
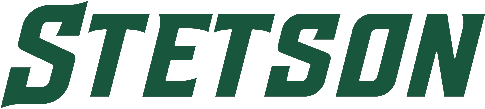
- Conference: Atlantic Sun Conference
- Record: 8–24 (6–12 ASUN)
- Head coach: Donnie Jones (6th season)
- Assistant coaches: Shawn Finney; Montay Brandon; Joey Gruden
- Home arena: Insight Credit Union Arena

2024–25 ASUN men's basketball standings
	Conf.				Overall
Team	W		L	PCT	W		L	PCT
Lipscomb †	14	–	4	.778	25	–	10	.714
North Alabama	14	–	4	.778	24	–	11	.686
Florida Gulf Coast	13	–	5	.722	19	–	15	.559
Jacksonville	12	–	6	.667	19	–	14	.576
Eastern Kentucky	12	–	6	.667	18	–	14	.563
Queens*	11	–	7	.611	20	–	15	.571
Austin Peay	8	–	10	.444	14	–	19	.424
North Florida	8	–	10	.444	15	–	17	.469
Stetson	6	–	12	.333	8	–	24	.250
Central Arkansas	4	–	14	.222	9	–	24	.273
West Georgia*	4	–	14	.222	6	–	25	.194
Bellarmine	2	–	16	.111	5	–	26	.161
† 2025 ASUN tournament winner * ineligible for the 2025 NCAA tournament due to transition from Division II

The 2024–25 Stetson Hatters men's basketball team represented Stetson University during the 2024–25 NCAA Division I men's basketball season. The Hatters, led by sixth-year head coach Donnie Jones, played their home games at the Insight Credit Union Arena in DeLand, Florida as members of the Atlantic Sun Conference (ASUN).

== Previous season ==
The Hatters finished the 2023–24 season 22–13, 11–5 in ASUN play, to finish in a tie for second place. They defeated Queens, Jacksonville and Austin Peay to win their first-ever ASUN tournament championship and in turn, their first-ever NCAA tournament appearance. In the NCAA tournament, they received the #16 seed in the East Region, where they fell to eventual national champions UConn in the first round.

== Roster ==
2024–25 Stetson Hatters men's basketball team
Players
Coaches

Pos.	#	Name	Height	Weight	Year	Previous school	Hometown
G	0	Jamie Jr. Phillips	6 ft 5 in (1.96 m)	—	Fr	Winter Haven High School	Winter Haven, FL
F	1	Josh Massey	6 ft 6 in (1.98 m)	198 lb (90 kg)	Sr	Wingate	Monroe, NC
G	2	Isaac Jones	6 ft 1 in (1.85 m)	—	So	Father Lopez Catholic High School	DeLand, FL
G	3	Mehki Ellison	6 ft 0 in (1.83 m)	—	Jr	Mott Community College	Flint, MI
G	4	Daniel Macgregor	6 ft 0 in (1.83 m)	—	Fr	Calvary Christian High School	Clearwater, FL
G	9	Blaize Sagna	6 ft 3 in (1.91 m)	—	Sr	Minnesota Crookston	London, England
G	10	Tristan Gross	6 ft 6 in (1.98 m)	—	So	St. Petersburg High School	St. Petersburg, FL
G	11	Andrew Taylor (6Y)	6 ft 3 in (1.91 m)	—	Sr	Mississippi State	Corbin, KY
F	13	Alex Doyle	6 ft 9 in (2.06 m)	—	So	DME Academy	Cholet, France
G	20	Ben Gladieux	6 ft 7 in (2.01 m)	—	Fr	Crossroads Christian School	Raleigh, NC
F	21	Finley Sheridan	6 ft 10 in (2.08 m)	—	RS So	Long Island Lutheran High School	Merrick, NY
G	22	Abramo Canka	6 ft 6 in (1.98 m)	200 lb (91 kg)	Jr	Wake Forest	Genoa, Italy
F	24	Jordan Wood	6 ft 10 in (2.08 m)	215 lb (98 kg)	GS	Tulane	San Antonio, TX
F	33	Landen Babusiak	6 ft 10 in (2.08 m)	—	So	Bosco Institute	St. John, IN
F	42	Treyton Thompson	7 ft 0 in (2.13 m)	210 lb (95 kg)	Sr	Minnesota	Glenwood, MN
F	77	Stefano Alesso	7 ft 0 in (2.13 m)	—	Fr	Bridgeport Prep	Buenos Aires, Argentina

Head coach

- Donnie Jones (Pikeville)

Assistant coach(es)

- Shawn Finney (Fairmont State)
- Montay Brandon (Florida State)
- Joey Gruden (Dayton)

Legend

- (C) Team captain
- (S) Suspended
- (I) Ineligible
- (W) Walk-on
- (6Y) Sixth-year senior
- Injured
- Current redshirt

Roster
Last update: January 7, 2025

== Schedule and results ==
Date time, TV	Rank^{#}	Opponent^{#}	Result	Record	Site (attendance) city, state
Exhibition
October 22, 2024*; 7:00 p.m., ESPN+		Columbia (SC)	W 105–60	–	Insight Credit Union Arena (202); DeLand, FL
October 29, 2024*; 7:00 p.m., ESPN+		Lynn	W 98–83	–	Insight Credit Union Arena (387); DeLand, FL
Non-conference regular season
November 4, 2024*; 7:00 p.m., ESPN+		New College	W 94–75	1–0	Insight Credit Union Arena (474); DeLand, FL
November 7, 2024*; 8:00 p.m., ESPN+		Omaha	L 76–79	1–1	Insight Credit Union Arena (561); DeLand, FL
November 11, 2024*; 6:00 p.m., ESPN+		at The Citadel; SoCon/ASUN Challenge	L 52–74	1–2	McAlister Field House (1,051); Charleston, SC
November 16, 2024*; 2:00 p.m., SECN+/ESPN+		at Oklahoma	L 64–85	1–3	Lloyd Noble Center (4,922); Norman, OK
November 21, 2024*; 5:30 p.m., BallerTV		vs. Toledo; Boardwalk Battle quarterfinals	L 78–103	1–4	Ocean Center (752); Daytona Beach, FL
November 22, 2024*; 1:00 p.m., BallerTV		vs. East Carolina; Boardwalk Battle consolation round	L 64–71	1–5	Ocean Center; Daytona Beach, FL
November 23, 2024*; 11:00 a.m., BallerTV		vs. La Salle; Boardwalk Battle 7th-place game	L 77–92	1–6	Ocean Center; Daytona Beach, FL
December 3, 2024*; 7:00 p.m., ESPN+		at South Florida	L 72–74	1–7	Yuengling Center (3,408); Tampa, FL
December 8, 2024*; 3:00 p.m., ESPN+		Mercer; SoCon/ASUN Challenge	L 83–89 ^{OT}	1–8	Insight Credit Union Arena (650); DeLand, FL
December 14, 2024*; 4:00 p.m., ESPN+		FIU	L 72–81	1–9	Insight Credit Union Arena (508); DeLand, FL
December 17, 2024*; 9:00 p.m., SECN		at LSU	L 53–99	1–10	Pete Maravich Assembly Center (6,599); Baton Rouge, LA
December 22, 2024*; 2:00 p.m., ESPN+		Fort Lauderdale	W 103–77	2–10	Insight Credit Union Arena (349); DeLand, FL
December 29, 2024*; 1:00 p.m., SECN+/ESPN+		at No. 6 Florida	L 45–85	2–11	O'Connell Center (10,676); Gainesville, FL
ASUN regular season
January 2, 2025; 7:00 p.m., ESPN+		at Queens	L 87–96	2–12 (0–1)	Curry Arena (574); Charlotte, NC
January 4, 2025; 2:00 p.m., ESPN+		at West Georgia	W 78–62	3–12 (1–1)	The Coliseum (362); Carrollton, GA
January 9, 2025; 7:00 p.m., ESPN+		Central Arkansas	W 75–65	4–12 (2–1)	Insight Credit Union Arena (515); DeLand, FL
January 11, 2025; 4:00 p.m., ESPN+		North Alabama	L 64–92	4–13 (2–2)	Insight Credit Union Arena (498); DeLand, FL
January 16, 2025; 7:00 p.m., ESPN+		Queens	L 60–95	4–14 (2–3)	Insight Credit Union Arena (476); DeLand, FL
January 18, 2025; 4:00 p.m., ESPN+		West Georgia	W 82–78	5–14 (3–3)	Insight Credit Union Arena (452); DeLand, FL
January 23, 2025; 7:00 p.m., ESPN+		at Eastern Kentucky	W 67–66	6–14 (4–3)	Baptist Health Arena (1,883); Richmond, KY
January 25, 2025; 3:00 p.m., ESPN+		at Bellarmine	W 81–76	7–14 (5–3)	Knights Hall (1,472); Louisville, KY
January 29, 2025; 7:00 p.m., ESPN+		at North Florida	L 100–101 ^{OT}	7–15 (5–4)	UNF Arena (1,389); Jacksonville, FL
February 1, 2025; 1:00 p.m., ESPN+		at Florida Gulf Coast	L 56–82	7–16 (5–5)	Alico Arena (3,570); Fort Myers, FL
February 6, 2025; 7:00 p.m., ESPN+		Jacksonville	L 65–74	7–17 (5–6)	Insight Credit Union Arena (433); DeLand, FL
February 8, 2025; 4:00 p.m., ESPN+		Eastern Kentucky	L 58–83	7–18 (5–7)	Insight Credit Union Arena (707); DeLand, FL
February 13, 2025; 8:15 p.m., ESPN+		at Lipscomb	L 60–93	7–19 (5–8)	Allen Arena (1,555); Nashville, TN
February 15, 2025; 5:00 p.m., ESPN+		at Austin Peay	L 63–76	7–20 (5–9)	F&M Bank Arena (1,467); Clarksville, TN
February 18, 2025; 7:00 p.m., ESPN+		North Florida	L 71–79	7–21 (5–10)	Insight Credit Union Arena (657); DeLand, FL
February 20, 2025; 7:00 p.m., ESPN+		Florida Gulf Coast	L 80–83	7–22 (5–11)	Insight Credit Union Arena (783); DeLand, FL
February 24, 2025; 7:00 p.m., ESPN+		Bellarmine	W 69–67	8–22 (6–11)	Insight Credit Union Arena (575); DeLand, FL
February 26, 2025; 7:00 p.m., ESPN+		at Jacksonville	L 72–79	8–23 (6–12)	Swisher Gymnasium (100); Jacksonville, FL
ASUN tournament
March 2, 2025; 7:00 p.m., ESPN+	(9)	vs. (10) Central Arkansas; First round	L 72–77	8–24	Allen Arena (207); Nashville, TN
*Non-conference game. ^{#}Rankings from AP poll. (#) Tournament seedings in parentheses. All times are in Eastern.
