= 2024–25 Bellarmine Knights men's basketball team =

American college basketball season

2024–25 Bellarmine Knights men's basketball
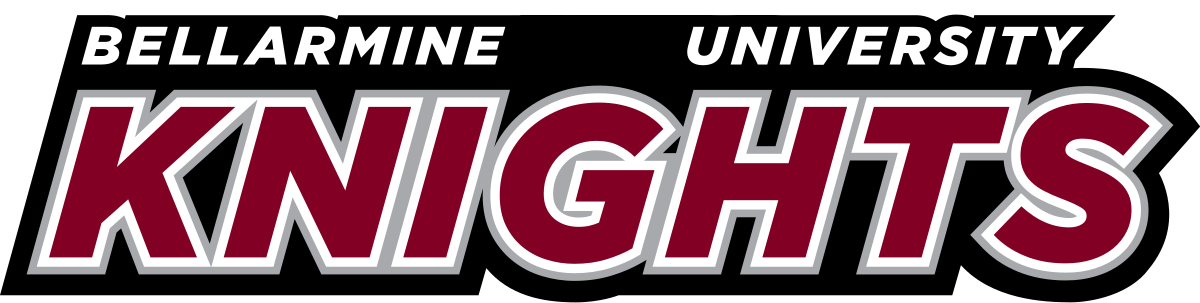
- Conference: Atlantic Sun Conference
- Record: 5–26 (2–16 ASUN)
- Head coach: Scott Davenport (20th season)
- Assistant coaches: Doug Davenport; Al Davis; Patrick Reilingh
- Home arena: Knights Hall

2024–25 ASUN men's basketball standings
	Conf.				Overall
Team	W		L	PCT	W		L	PCT
Lipscomb †	14	–	4	.778	25	–	10	.714
North Alabama	14	–	4	.778	24	–	11	.686
Florida Gulf Coast	13	–	5	.722	19	–	15	.559
Jacksonville	12	–	6	.667	19	–	14	.576
Eastern Kentucky	12	–	6	.667	18	–	14	.563
Queens*	11	–	7	.611	20	–	15	.571
Austin Peay	8	–	10	.444	14	–	19	.424
North Florida	8	–	10	.444	15	–	17	.469
Stetson	6	–	12	.333	8	–	24	.250
Central Arkansas	4	–	14	.222	9	–	24	.273
West Georgia*	4	–	14	.222	6	–	25	.194
Bellarmine	2	–	16	.111	5	–	26	.161
† 2025 ASUN tournament winner * ineligible for the 2025 NCAA tournament due to transition from Division II

The 2024–25 Bellarmine Knights men's basketball team represented Bellarmine University during the 2024–25 NCAA Division I men's basketball season. The Knights, led by 20th-year head coach Scott Davenport, played their home games at Knights Hall located in Louisville, Kentucky as members of the Atlantic Sun Conference. They finished the season 5–26, 2–16 in ASUN play to finish in last place. They failed to qualify for the ASUN tournament.

On March 9, 2025, head coach Scott Davenport announced he was retiring. The school announced that Scott's son, assistant coach Doug Davenport, would be the team's new head coach.

== Previous season ==
The Knights finished the 2023–24 season 8–23, 4–12 in ASUN play to finish in 12th (last) place. They failed to qualify for the ASUN tournament, as only the top ten team qualify.

The Knights were in the final year of a four-year transition from Division II to Division I, making the 2023–24 season the final season that they were ineligible for the NCAA tournament.

This was also the Knights' final season at Freedom Hall. Near the start of the 2024–25 school year, which coincided with the end of Bellarmine's transition to Division I, the school announced that home games would return to campus at Knights Hall.

== Roster ==
2024–25 Bellarmine Knights men's basketball team
Players
Coaches

Pos.	#	Name	Height	Weight	Year	Previous school	Hometown
G	0	AJ Lux	6 ft 5 in (1.96 m)	175 lb (79 kg)	RS Fr	Crown Point High School	Crown Point, Indiana
G	1	Landin Hacker	6 ft 0 in (1.83 m)	185 lb (84 kg)	RS Jr	Center Grove High School	Greenwood, Indiana
G	2	Tyler Doyle	6 ft 5 in (1.96 m)	185 lb (84 kg)	Fr	Lexington Catholic High School	Lexington, Kentucky
G	4	Dezmond McKinney	6 ft 0 in (1.83 m)	185 lb (84 kg)	RS Sr	North Dakota State	Raytown, Missouri
C	5	Bailey Temming	6 ft 10 in (2.08 m)	220 lb (100 kg)	Fr	Bishop Fenwick High School	Franklin, Ohio
G	8	Kenyon Goodin	6 ft 3 in (1.91 m)	190 lb (86 kg)	RS Fr	Collins High School	Shelbyville, Kentucky
G	10	Grant Whitaker	6 ft 4 in (1.93 m)	185 lb (84 kg)	RS Fr	Murray High School	Murray, Kentucky
G	11	Billy Smith	6 ft 7 in (2.01 m)	205 lb (93 kg)	Jr	Miami (OH)	Indianapolis, Indiana
G	12	Myles Watkins	6 ft 3 in (1.91 m)	185 lb (84 kg)	Jr	Pasadena City College	Frisco, Texas
F	15	Luke Anderson	6 ft 8 in (2.03 m)	200 lb (91 kg)	RS Fr	North Oldham High School	Goshen, Kentucky
G	21	Grant Neal	6 ft 3 in (1.91 m)	180 lb (82 kg)	Fr	North Oldham High School	Prospect, Kentucky
G	23	Zach Reed	6 ft 2 in (1.88 m)	185 lb (84 kg)	RS So	Brebeuf Jesuit Prep	Indianapolis, Indiana
F	24	Dylan Branson	6 ft 5 in (1.96 m)	215 lb (98 kg)	GS	Southeast Missouri State	St. Louis, Missouri
F	32	Jack Karasinski	6 ft 7 in (2.01 m)	215 lb (98 kg)	RS Jr	William & Mary	Grand Rapids, Michigan
G	33	Ben Johnson	6 ft 3 in (1.91 m)	195 lb (88 kg)	RS Jr	Lexington Catholic High School	Lexington, Kentucky
F	42	Curt Hopf	6 ft 8 in (2.03 m)	225 lb (102 kg)	RS Jr	Barr-Reeve High School	Montgomery, Indiana

Head coach

- Scott Davenport (Louisville)

Assistant coach(es)

- Doug Davenport (Bellarmine)
- Al Davis (Bellarmine)
- Patrick Reilingh (Louisville)

Legend

- (C) Team captain
- (S) Suspended
- (I) Ineligible
- (W) Walk-on
- Injured
- Current redshirt

Roster
Last update: October 17, 2024

== Schedule and results ==
Date time, TV	Rank^{#}	Opponent^{#}	Result	Record	Site (attendance) city, state
Exhibition
October 29, 2024*; 11:00 am		Centre	W 92–68		Knights Hall (1,162); Louisville, KY
Non-conference regular season
November 4, 2024*; 7:00 pm, ESPN+		at VCU	L 65–84	0–1	Siegel Center (7,637); Richmond, VA
November 9, 2024*; 3:00 pm, ESPN+		VMI; SoCon/ASUN Challenge	L 71–76	0–2	Knights Hall (1,174); Louisville, KY
November 13, 2024*; 6:30 pm, ESPN+		Southern Indiana; I-64 Showcase	L 69–71	0–3	Knights Hall (1,527); Louisville, KY
November 16, 2024*; 7:00 pm, ESPN+		at Marshall; I-64 Showcase	L 62–83	0–4	Cam Henderson Center (4,153); Huntington, WV
November 19, 2024*; 7:00 pm, ESPN+		at Louisville	L 68–100	0–5	KFC Yum! Center (12,220); Louisville, KY
November 23, 2024*; 3:00 pm, ESPN+		Bowling Green	W 80–68	1–5	Knights Hall (1,282); Louisville, KY
November 26, 2024*; 6:30 pm, ESPN+		Midway	W 101–60	2–5	Knights Hall (1,174); Louisville, KY
November 30, 2024*; 6:00 pm, ESPN+/FDSNOH		at Northern Kentucky	L 70–86	2–6	Truist Arena (3,325); Highland Heights, KY
December 4, 2024*; 7:00 pm, ESPN+		at Western Carolina; SoCon/ASUN Challenge	L 74–86	2–7	Ramsey Center (1,812); Cullowhee, NC
December 7, 2024*; 3:00 pm, ESPN+		Brescia	W 94–66	3–7	Knights Hall (1,123); Louisville, KY
December 14, 2024*; 3:00 pm, ESPN+		Ball State	L 82–86	3–8	Knights Hall (1,572); Louisville, KY
December 19, 2024*; 8:30 pm, MW Network		at Wyoming	L 55–92	3–9	Arena-Auditorium (2,998); Laramie, WY
December 21, 2024*; 3:00 pm, ESPN+		at Colorado	L 55–79	3–10	CU Events Center (7,684); Boulder, CO
ASUN regular season
January 2, 2025; 7:00 pm, ESPN+		at North Alabama	L 66–82	3–11 (0–1)	CB&S Bank Arena (1,563); Florence, AL
January 4, 2025; 2:00 pm, ESPN+		at Central Arkansas	L 65–71	3–12 (0–2)	Farris Center (975); Conway, AR
January 9, 2025; 6:30 pm, ESPN+		Jacksonville	L 59–74	3–13 (0–3)	Knights Hall (1,491); Louisville, KY
January 11, 2025; 6:30 pm, ESPN+		North Florida	L 83–98	3–14 (0–4)	Knights Hall (1,372); Louisville, KY
January 16, 2025; 6:30 pm, ESPN+		Lipscomb	L 53–87	3–15 (0–5)	Knights Hall (1,272); Louisville, KY
January 18, 2025; 7:00 pm, ESPN+		at Eastern Kentucky	L 69–72	3–16 (0–6)	Baptist Health Arena (2,004); Richmond, KY
January 23, 2025; 6:30 pm, ESPN+		Florida Gulf Coast	L 61–77	3–17 (0–7)	Knights Hall (1,383); Louisville, KY
January 25, 2025; 3:00 pm, ESPN+		Stetson	L 76–81	3–18 (0–8)	Knights Hall (1,472); Louisville, KY
January 30, 2025; 8:00 pm, ESPN+		at Austin Peay	L 77–86 ^{OT}	3–19 (0–9)	F&M Bank Arena (1,257); Clarksville, TN
February 1, 2025; 5:00 pm, ESPN+		at Lipscomb	L 80–87	3–20 (0–10)	Allen Arena (1,227); Nashville, TN
February 6, 2025; 8:00 pm, ESPN+		at North Florida	L 88–95	3–21 (0–11)	UNF Arena (1,286); Jacksonville, FL
February 8, 2025; 7:00 pm, ESPN+		at Jacksonville	L 64–73	3–22 (0–12)	Swisher Gymnasium (700); Jacksonville, FL
February 13, 2025; 6:30 pm, ESPN+		Queens	L 87–92 ^{OT}	3–23 (0–13)	Knights Hall (1,132); Louisville, KY
February 15, 2025; 6:30 pm, ESPN+		West Georgia	L 76–81	3–24 (0–14)	Knights Hall (1,472); Louisville, KY
February 18, 2025; 6:30 pm, ESPN+		Austin Peay	W 94–68	4–24 (1–14)	Knights Hall (1,173); Louisville, KY
February 20, 2025; 6:30 pm, ESPN+		Eastern Kentucky	W 80–74	5–24 (2–14)	Knights Hall (1,582); Louisville, KY
February 24, 2025; 7:00 pm, ESPN+		at Stetson	L 67–69	5–25 (2–15)	Insight Credit Union Arena (575); DeLand, FL
February 26, 2025; 7:00 pm, ESPN+		at Florida Gulf Coast	L 61–80	5–26 (2–16)	Alico Arena (2,190); Fort Myers, FL
*Non-conference game. ^{#}Rankings from AP Poll. (#) Tournament seedings in parentheses. All times are in Eastern.
