= 2024–25 Eastern Kentucky Colonels men's basketball team =

American college basketball season

2024–25 Eastern Kentucky Colonels men's basketball
- Conference: Atlantic Sun Conference
- Record: 18–14 (12–6 ASUN)
- Head coach: A. W. Hamilton (7th season)
- Assistant coaches: AJ Clark; Ron Jirsa; Steve Lepore; Jake Lorbach
- Home arena: Baptist Health Arena

2024–25 ASUN men's basketball standings
	Conf.				Overall
Team	W		L	PCT	W		L	PCT
Lipscomb †	14	–	4	.778	25	–	10	.714
North Alabama	14	–	4	.778	24	–	11	.686
Florida Gulf Coast	13	–	5	.722	19	–	15	.559
Jacksonville	12	–	6	.667	19	–	14	.576
Eastern Kentucky	12	–	6	.667	18	–	14	.563
Queens*	11	–	7	.611	20	–	15	.571
Austin Peay	8	–	10	.444	14	–	19	.424
North Florida	8	–	10	.444	15	–	17	.469
Stetson	6	–	12	.333	8	–	24	.250
Central Arkansas	4	–	14	.222	9	–	24	.273
West Georgia*	4	–	14	.222	6	–	25	.194
Bellarmine	2	–	16	.111	5	–	26	.161
† 2025 ASUN tournament winner * ineligible for the 2025 NCAA tournament due to transition from Division II

The 2024–25 Eastern Kentucky Colonels men's basketball team represented Eastern Kentucky University during the 2024–25 NCAA Division I men's basketball season. The Colonels were led by seventh-year head coach A. W. Hamilton as members of the Atlantic Sun Conference. The Colonels played their four non-conference home games at the Seabury Center on the campus of Berea College in Berea, Kentucky, as their home arena, Baptist Health Arena in Richmond, Kentucky, is undergoing renovations, with the renovations expected to be completed in time for conference play.

== Previous season ==
The Colonels finished the 2023–24 season 17–14, 12–4 in ASUN play to finish as ASUN regular season champions. They were upset by #10 seed Jacksonville in the quarterfinals of the ASUN tournament. Due to new rule changes that no longer give automatic bids to conference champions who failed to win their conference championship, the Colonels did not qualify for the NIT, ending their season.

== Roster ==
2024–25 Eastern Kentucky Colonels men's basketball team
Players
Coaches

Pos.	#	Name	Height	Weight	Year	Previous school	Hometown
G	0	Turner Buttry	5 ft 11 in (1.8 m)	165 lb (75 kg)	Jr	Bowling Green HS	Bowling Green, Kentucky
F	1	Mayar Wol	6 ft 8 in (2.03 m)	196 lb (89 kg)	So	Charleston	Raleigh, North Carolina
G	2	Jordan Crawford	6 ft 3 in (1.91 m)	178 lb (81 kg)	RS So	Charleston	Charlotte, North Carolina
G	3	George Kimble III	6 ft 2 in (1.88 m)	184 lb (83 kg)	So	Eckerd College	Tampa, Florida
G	4	Micah Davis	6 ft 2 in (1.88 m)	172 lb (78 kg)	Fr	Franklin Community HS	Greenwood, Indiana
G/F	5	Jayden Harris	6 ft 7 in (2.01 m)	189 lb (86 kg)	Fr	Massanutten Military Academy	Dumfries, Virginia
G/F	10	Devontae Blanton	6 ft 6 in (1.98 m)	214 lb (97 kg)	Sr	St. Edward HS	Macedonia, Ohio
G	11	Jackson Holt	6 ft 4 in (1.93 m)	185 lb (84 kg)	RS So	Moravian Prep	Cincinnati, Ohio
F	12	Robby Todd	6 ft 7 in (2.01 m)	220 lb (100 kg)	So	Madison Central HS	Richmond, Kentucky
F	13	Montavious Myrick	6 ft 8 in (2.03 m)	208 lb (94 kg)	Sr	Southern Union State CC	Atlanta, Georgia
G	15	Reece Holbrook	5 ft 11 in (1.8 m)	152 lb (69 kg)	Fr	Louisville Collegiate School	Louisville, Kentucky
F	21	Yvens Paul	6 ft 7 in (2.01 m)	220 lb (100 kg)	So	Florida SouthWestern State	Naples, Florida
C	22	Cyril Martynov	7 ft 0 in (2.13 m)	229 lb (104 kg)	Jr	Eastern Michigan	Barrie, Ontario
C	23	James Mayor	6 ft 10 in (2.08 m)	200 lb (91 kg)	Fr	Paul Blazer HS	Ashland, Kentucky
G	25	Tyler Andrews	6 ft 6 in (1.98 m)	205 lb (93 kg)	Jr	Kansas City	Los Angeles, California
C	42	DJ Nussbaum	6 ft 8 in (2.03 m)	235 lb (107 kg)	Sr	VMI	Houston, Texas

Head coach

- A. W. Hamilton (Marshall)

Assistant coach(es)

- AJ Clark (Pfeiffer)
- Ron Jirsa (Gettysburg)
- Steve Lepore (Wake Forest)
- Jake Lorbach (Ohio State)

Legend

- (C) Team captain
- (S) Suspended
- (I) Ineligible
- (W) Walk-on
- Injured
- Current redshirt

Roster
Last update: October 19, 2024

== Schedule and results ==
Date time, TV	Rank^{#}	Opponent^{#}	Result	Record	Site (attendance) city, state
Non-conference regular season
November 4, 2024*; 7:00 p.m., ESPN+		Alice Lloyd	W 98–69	1–0	Seabury Center (702); Berea, KY
November 8, 2024*; 7:00 p.m., ESPN+		at East Tennessee State; SoCon/ASUN Challenge	W 82–78	2–0	Freedom Hall Civic Center (2,435); Johnson City, TN
November 12, 2024*; 7:00 p.m., ACCN		at Clemson	L 62–75	2–1	Littlejohn Coliseum (7,258); Clemson, SC
November 19, 2024*; 7:00 p.m., NEC Front Row		at Chicago State	W 86–66	3–1	Jones Convocation Center (101); Chicago, IL
November 25, 2024*; 12:00 p.m., FloHoops		vs. Ball State; Gulf Coast Showcase	L 61–63	3–2	Hertz Arena (542); Estero, FL
November 26, 2024*; 12:00 p.m., FloHoops		vs. Southern Illinois; Gulf Coast Showcase	W 77–72	4–2	Hertz Arena (377); Estero, FL
November 27, 2024*; 12:00 p.m., FloHoops		at Louisiana Tech; Gulf Coast Showcase	L 69–78	4–3	Hertz Arena (268); Estero, FL
December 1, 2024*; 3:00 p.m., ESPN+		at Troy	L 74–84	4–4	Trojan Arena (2,346); Troy, AL
December 6, 2024*; 7:00 p.m., ESPN+		Campbellsville–Harrodsburg	W 98–62	5–4	Seabury Center (509); Berea, KY
December 11, 2024*; 7:00 p.m., ACCN/ESPN+		at Pittsburgh	L 56–96	5–5	Petersen Events Center (5,948); Pittsburgh, PA
December 14, 2024*; 8:00 p.m., ESPN+		Eastern Illinois	W 81–66	6–5	Seabury Center (457); Berea, KY
December 21, 2024*; 2:00 p.m., ESPN+		Jacksonville State	L 80–91	6–6	Seabury Center (495); Berea, KY
December 28, 2024*; 12:00 p.m., The CW		at Louisville	L 76–78	6–7	KFC Yum! Center (13,150); Louisville, KY
ASUN regular season
January 2, 2025; 7:30 p.m., ESPN+		at Central Arkansas	W 89–83 ^{2OT}	7–7 (1–0)	Farris Center (793); Conway, AR
January 4, 2025; 5:30 p.m., ESPN+		at North Alabama	L 67–88	7–8 (1–1)	CB&S Bank Arena (2,025); Florence, AL
January 9, 2025; 7:00 p.m., ESPN+		North Florida	W 79–74	8–8 (2–1)	Baptist Health Arena (1,706); Richmond, KY
January 11, 2025; 4:00 p.m., ESPN+		Jacksonville	L 75–82	8–9 (2–2)	Baptist Health Arena (1,872); Richmond, KY
January 16, 2025; 8:00 p.m., ESPN+		at Austin Peay	L 90–97 ^{OT}	8–10 (2–3)	F&M Bank Arena (1,326); Clarksville, TN
January 18, 2025; 7:00 p.m., ESPN+		Bellarmine	W 72–69	9–10 (3–3)	Baptist Health Arena (2,004); Richmond, KY
January 23, 2025; 7:00 p.m., ESPN+		Stetson	L 66–67	9–11 (3–4)	Baptist Health Arena (1,883); Richmond, KY
January 25, 2025; 4:00 p.m., ESPN+		Florida Gulf Coast	W 81–77	10–11 (4–4)	Baptist Health Arena (2,761); Richmond, KY
January 30, 2025; 8:00 p.m., ESPN+		at Lipscomb	W 80–71	11–11 (5–4)	Allen Arena (1011); Nashville, TN
February 1, 2025; 4:00 p.m., ESPN+		Austin Peay	W 88–82	12–11 (6–4)	Baptist Health Arena (2,267); Richmond, KY
February 6, 2025; 7:00 p.m., ESPN+		at Florida Gulf Coast	W 92–74	13–11 (7–4)	Alico Arena (2,632); Fort Myers, FL
February 8, 2025; 4:00 p.m., ESPN+		at Stetson	W 83–58	14–11 (8–4)	Insight Credit Union Arena (707); DeLand, FL
February 13, 2025; 7:00 p.m., ESPN+		West Georgia	W 95–73	15–11 (9–4)	Baptist Health Arena (1,891); Richmond, KY
February 15, 2025; 4:00 p.m., ESPN+		Queens	W 86–80 ^{OT}	16–11 (10–4)	Baptist Health Arena (2,216); Richmond, KY
February 18, 2025; 7:00 p.m., ESPN+		Lipscomb	W 66–57	17–11 (11–4)	Baptist Health Arena (3,155); Richmond, KY
February 20, 2025; 6:30 p.m., ESPN+		at Bellarmine	L 74–80	17–12 (11–5)	Knights Hall (1,582); Louisville, KY
February 24, 2025; 7:00 p.m., ESPN+		at Jacksonville	L 55–59	17–13 (11–6)	Swisher Gymnasium (763); Jacksonville, FL
February 26, 2025; 7:00 p.m., ESPN+		at North Florida	W 86–81	18–13 (12–6)	UNF Arena (1,497); Jacksonville, FL
ASUN tournament
March 3, 2025; 7:00 p.m., ESPN+	(5)	at (4) Jacksonville; Quarterfinals	L 67–78	18–14	Swisher Gymnasium (1,000); Jacksonville, FL
*Non-conference game. ^{#}Rankings from AP Poll. (#) Tournament seedings in parentheses. All times are in Eastern.
