= 2024–25 West Georgia Wolves men's basketball team =

American college basketball season

2024–25 West Georgia Wolves men's basketball
- Conference: Atlantic Sun Conference
- Record: 6–25 (4–14 ASUN)
- Head coach: Dave Moore (7th season)
- Assistant coaches: Andy Young; Mark Schult; Willie Evans
- Home arena: The Coliseum

2024–25 ASUN men's basketball standings
| | Conf. | | | | Overall |
| Team | W | | L | PCT | W | | L | PCT |
|---|---|---|---|---|---|---|---|---|
| Lipscomb † | 14 | – | 4 | .778 | 25 | – | 10 | .714 |
| North Alabama | 14 | – | 4 | .778 | 24 | – | 11 | .686 |
| Florida Gulf Coast | 13 | – | 5 | .722 | 19 | – | 15 | .559 |
| Jacksonville | 12 | – | 6 | .667 | 19 | – | 14 | .576 |
| Eastern Kentucky | 12 | – | 6 | .667 | 18 | – | 14 | .563 |
| Queens* | 11 | – | 7 | .611 | 20 | – | 15 | .571 |
| Austin Peay | 8 | – | 10 | .444 | 14 | – | 19 | .424 |
| North Florida | 8 | – | 10 | .444 | 15 | – | 17 | .469 |
| Stetson | 6 | – | 12 | .333 | 8 | – | 24 | .250 |
| Central Arkansas | 4 | – | 14 | .222 | 9 | – | 24 | .273 |
| West Georgia* | 4 | – | 14 | .222 | 6 | – | 25 | .194 |
| Bellarmine | 2 | – | 16 | .111 | 5 | – | 26 | .161 |
† 2025 ASUN tournament winner * ineligible for the 2025 NCAA tournament due to transition from Division II

The 2024–25 West Georgia Wolves men's basketball team represented the University of West Georgia during the 2024–25 NCAA Division I men's basketball season. The Wolves, led by seventh-year head coach Dave Moore, played their home games at The Coliseum in Carrollton, Georgia as first-year members of the Atlantic Sun Conference (ASUN).

This season marked West Georgia's first year of a three-year transition period from Division II to Division I. As a result, the Wolves are currently not eligible to participate in the NCAA tournament until the 2027–28 season.

== Previous season ==
The Wolves finished the 2023–24 season 27–6, 19–5 in Gulf South Conference (GSC) play, to finish as GSC regular-season champions. They defeated Union, West Alabama and Alabama–Huntsville to win the GSC tournament and earn the conference's automatic bid into the NCAA DII tournament. They received the #2 seed in the South regional, where they defeated conference foe Lee in the first round before falling to Florida Southern in the regional semifinals.

== Roster ==
2024–25 West Georgia Wolves men's basketball team
Players
Coaches

| Pos. | # | Name | Height | Weight | Year | Previous school | Hometown |
|---|---|---|---|---|---|---|---|
| G | 0 | Kyric Davis | 6 ft 5 in (1.96 m) | 198 lb (90 kg) | Jr | South Georgia State | Americus, GA |
| G | 1 | Brady Hardewig | 6 ft 2 in (1.88 m) | 192 lb (87 kg) | RS Fr | Turpin High School | Cincinnati, OH |
| PG | 2 | Demetrus II Johnson | 6 ft 0 in (1.83 m) | 180 lb (82 kg) | Jr | Highland Community College | Chandler, AZ |
| PF | 3 | Xavier Shegog | 6 ft 6 in (1.98 m) | 204 lb (93 kg) | Fr | Mount Vernon School | Nashville, TN |
| F | 4 | Rickey Ballard | 6 ft 7 in (2.01 m) | 200 lb (91 kg) | Jr | Lynn | Coral Springs, FL |
| F | 5 | Shelton Williams-Dryden | 6 ft 6 in (1.98 m) | 206 lb (93 kg) | Jr | Milwaukee Area Tech | Milwaukee, WI |
| G | 10 | Michael Griffin | 6 ft 4 in (1.93 m) | 188 lb (85 kg) | Sr | North Florida | Jacksonville, FL |
| F | 11 | Kolten Griffin | 6 ft 6 in (1.98 m) | 195 lb (88 kg) | Sr | North Central Missouri | St. Joseph, MO |
| G | 12 | Eric Baldassarre | 6 ft 4 in (1.93 m) | 172 lb (78 kg) | Fr | IMG Academy | Lancaster, PA |
| G/F | 13 | Sam Maynard | 6 ft 6 in (1.98 m) | 204 lb (93 kg) | Fr | West Forsyth High School | Forsyth, GA |
| G | 20 | Max Young | 6 ft 3 in (1.91 m) | 189 lb (86 kg) | Fr | Central High School | Carrollton, GA |
| G | 21 | Tauris Watson | 6 ft 3 in (1.91 m) | 202 lb (92 kg) | Jr | Wofford | Lexington, SC |
| PF | 22 | Kenneth Chime | 6 ft 9 in (2.06 m) | 206 lb (93 kg) | Fr | The McCallie School | Enugu, Nigeria |
| G | 23 | Malcolm Noel | 5 ft 11 in (1.8 m) | 170 lb (77 kg) | Jr | Covenant College | Peachtree City, GA |
| C | 24 | Tamaury Releford | 6 ft 9 in (2.06 m) | 221 lb (100 kg) | Sr | Connors State | Fort Smith, AR |
| G | 30 | Cameron Merritt | 5 ft 11 in (1.8 m) | 160 lb (73 kg) | RS Fr | Carrollton High School | Carrollton, GA |

Head coach

- Dave Moore (Bethel (TN))

Assistant coach(es)

- Andy Young (West Georgia)
- Mark Schult (Wittenberg)
- Willie Evans (West Georgia)

Legend

- (C) Team captain
- (S) Suspended
- (I) Ineligible
- (W) Walk-on
- Injured
- Current redshirt

Roster
Last update: October 1, 2024

== Schedule and results ==
| Date time, TV | Rank^{#} | Opponent^{#} | Result | Record | Site (attendance) city, state |
Non-conference regular season
| November 4, 2024*; 6:30 p.m., SECN+/ESPN+ | | at Mississippi State | L 60–95 | 0–1 | Humphrey Coliseum (9,125); Starkville, MS |
| November 6, 2024*; 7:30 p.m., ACCNX/ESPN+ | | at Georgia Tech | L 62–85 | 0–2 | McCamish Pavilion (3,530); Atlanta, GA |
| November 12, 2024*; 7:00 p.m., ESPN+ | | at Tennessee Tech | L 73–76 | 0–3 | Hooper Eblen Center (716); Cookeville, TN |
| November 15, 2024*; 7:00 p.m., ESPN+ | | at South Florida | L 55–74 | 0–4 | Yuengling Center (4,411); Tampa, FL |
| November 19, 2024*; 7:00 p.m., ESPN+ | | Troy | L 65–84 | 0–5 | The Coliseum (1,342); Carrollton, GA |
| November 23, 2024*; 12:00 p.m., ESPN+ | | at Georgia Southern | L 54–64 | 0–6 | Hanner Fieldhouse (1,552); Statesboro, GA |
| November 26, 2024*; 4:00 p.m., ESPN+ | | vs. Utah Valley; Samford Thanksgiving Invitational | L 74–77 | 0–7 | Pete Hanna Center (177); Homewood, AL |
| November 27, 2024*; 4:00 p.m., ESPN+ | | vs. North Dakota State; Samford Thanksgiving Invitational | L 61–73 | 0–8 | Pete Hanna Center (123); Homewood, AL |
| November 29, 2024*; 4:00 p.m., ESPN+ | | at Samford; Samford Thanksgiving Invitational | L 65–86 | 0–9 | Pete Hanna Center (887); Homewood, AL |
| December 4, 2024*; 11:00 a.m., ESPN+ | | at Mercer; SoCon/ASUN Challenge | L 72–86 | 0–10 | Hawkins Arena (1,309); Macon, GA |
| December 7, 2024*; 2:00 p.m., ESPN+ | | Tennessee Tech | W 78–73 | 1–10 | The Coliseum (872); Carrollton, GA |
| December 17, 2024*; 7:00 p.m., ESPN+ | | at Charlotte | L 70–75 | 1–11 | Dale F. Halton Arena (2,058); Charlotte, NC |
| December 21, 2024*; 2:00 p.m., ESPN+ | | Brewton–Parker | W 107–61 | 2–11 | The Coliseum (278); Carrollton, GA |
ASUN regular season
| January 2, 2025; 7:00 p.m., ESPN+ | | Florida Gulf Coast | L 68–79 | 2–12 (0–1) | The Coliseum (307); Carrollton, GA |
| January 4, 2025; 2:00 p.m., ESPN+ | | Stetson | L 62–78 | 2–13 (0–2) | The Coliseum (362); Carrollton, GA |
| January 9, 2025; 8:00 p.m., ESPN+ | | at Austin Peay | W 72–68 | 3–13 (1–2) | F&M Bank Arena (2,216); Clarksville, TN |
| January 11, 2025; 5:00 p.m., ESPN+ | | at Lipscomb | L 67–86 | 3–14 (1–3) | Allen Arena (1,864); Nashville, TN |
| January 16, 2025; 6:30 p.m., ESPN+ | | at Florida Gulf Coast | L 60–82 | 3–15 (1–4) | Alico Arena (1,954); Fort Myers, FL |
| January 18, 2025; 4:00 p.m., ESPN+ | | at Stetson | L 78–82 | 3–16 (1–5) | Insight Credit Union Arena (452); DeLand, FL |
| January 23, 2025; 7:00 p.m., ESPN+ | | Jacksonville | L 62–79 | 3–17 (1–6) | The Coliseum (947); Carrollton, GA |
| January 25, 2025; 2:00 p.m., ESPN+ | | North Florida | W 92–72 | 4–17 (2–6) | The Coliseum (868); Carrollton, GA |
| January 29, 2025; 7:30 p.m., ESPN+ | | at Central Arkansas | L 70–75 | 4–18 (2–7) | Farris Center (1048); Conway, AR |
| February 1, 2025; 1:00 p.m., ESPN+ | | at Queens | L 68–87 | 4–19 (2–8) | Curry Arena (415); Charlotte, NC |
| February 5, 2025; 7:00 p.m., ESPN+ | | Lipscomb | L 67–76 | 4–20 (2–9) | The Coliseum (774); Carrollton, GA |
| February 8, 2025; 2:00 p.m., ESPN+ | | North Alabama | L 61–78 | 4–21 (2–10) | The Coliseum (1,723); Carrollton, GA |
| February 13, 2025; 7:00 p.m., ESPN+ | | at Eastern Kentucky | L 73–95 | 4–22 (2–11) | Baptist Health Arena (1,891); Richmond, KY |
| February 15, 2025; 6:30 p.m., ESPN+ | | at Bellarmine | W 81–76 | 5–22 (3–11) | Knights Hall (1,472); Louisville, KY |
| February 18, 2025; 7:00 p.m., ESPN+ | | at North Alabama | L 62–80 | 5–23 (3–12) | CB&S Bank Arena (2,395); Florence, AL |
| February 20, 2025; 7:45 p.m., ESPN+ | | Central Arkansas | L 71–82 | 5–24 (3–13) | The Coliseum (1,537); Carrollton, GA |
| February 24, 2025; 7:00 p.m., ESPN+ | | Queens | L 57–72 | 5–25 (3–14) | The Coliseum (523); Carrollton, GA |
| February 26, 2025; 7:00 p.m., ESPN+ | | Austin Peay | W 73–70 | 6–25 (4–14) | The Coliseum (1,092); Carrollton, GA |
*Non-conference game. ^{#}Rankings from AP poll. (#) Tournament seedings in parentheses. All times are in Eastern.
