= Lennie Acuff =

American basketball player and coach

Current position
- Title: Head coach
- Team: Samford
- Conference: Southern
- Record: 18–14 (.563)

Biographical details
- Born: January 24, 1965 (age 61); Huntsville, Alabama, U.S.

Playing career
- 1985–1988: Shorter

Coaching career (HC unless noted)
- 1990–1993: Belhaven
- 1993–1997: Berry
- 1997–2019: Alabama–Huntsville
- 2019–2025: Lipscomb
- 2025–present: Samford

Head coaching record
- Overall: 582–319 (.646) (NCAA); 114–114 (.500) (NAIA)
- Tournaments: 0–1 (NCAA Division I)

Accomplishments and honors

Championships
- 8x Gulf South regular season; 3× Gulf South tournament (2012, 2015, 2017); A-Sun regular season (2025); A-Sun tournament (2025)

Awards
- 8× Gulf South Coach of the Year (1999, 2003, 2005, 2010–2012, 2015, 2016); ASUN Coach of the Year (2025)

Lennie Acuff (born January 24, 1965) is an American basketball coach who is currently the head men's basketball coach at Samford University.

== Playing career ==
Acuff attended Shorter College where he set the single game, single season and career record for assists, which still stand to this day.

== Coaching career ==
At 25, Acuff landed his first head coaching job with Belhaven College where he posted a 49–50 record over three seasons. He then moved on to Berry College where he'd compile a 65–64 overall record with back-to-back 20-win seasons in his final two seasons. Acuff would accept the head coaching position at Alabama–Huntsville, the town he grew up in. Over the course of 22 seasons at the helm of the Chargers, he would guide the team to eight Gulf South Conference regular season crowns, three conference tournament titles and 11 NCAA Division II tournament appearances, including the Elite Eight in 2011 and 2012.

On April 24, 2019 Acuff was named the 19th head men's basketball coach at Lipscomb, replacing Casey Alexander who departed for the same position at Belmont.

On April 9, 2025 Acuff, who led Lipscomb to three consecutive 20-win seasons and a spot in the 2025 NCAA tournament, was announced as Samford's new head coach, replacing Bucky McMillan, who left for the same position at Texas A&M.

== Head coaching record ==
=== NAIA ===
Record table
Season	Team	Overall	Conference	Standing	Postseason
Belhaven College (N/A) (1990–1993)
1990–91	Belhaven	14–19			
1991–92	Belhaven	17–16			
1992–93	Belhaven	18–15			
Belhaven NAIA:		49–50 (.495)			
Berry College (N/A) (1993–1997)
1993–94	Berry College	13–20			
1994–95	Berry College	11–19			
1995–96	Berry College	20–13			
1996–97	Berry College	21–12			
Berry College NAIA:		65–64 (.504)			
Total:		114–114 (.500)			
National champion Postseason invitational champion Conference regular season champion Conference regular season and conference tournament champion Division regular season champion Division regular season and conference tournament champion Conference tournament champion

=== NCAA DII ===
Record table
Season	Team	Overall	Conference	Standing	Postseason
Alabama–Huntsville (Gulf South Conference) (1997–2019)
1997–98	Alabama–Huntsville	9–17	5–9	7th (East)	
1998–99	Alabama–Huntsville	15–12	9–5	3rd (East)	
1999–00	Alabama–Huntsville	22–7	11–3	1st (East)	NCAA Second Round
2000–01	Alabama–Huntsville	19–8	9–5	2nd (East)	
2001–02	Alabama–Huntsville	17–9	7–7	5th (East)	
2002–03	Alabama–Huntsville	20–11	11–3	1st (East)	NCAA First Round
2003–04	Alabama–Huntsville	14–13	6–8	6th (East)	
2004–05	Alabama–Huntsville	16–12	9–5	3rd (East)	
2005–06	Alabama–Huntsville	22–8	10–4	2nd (East)	NCAA first round
2006–07	Alabama–Huntsville	18–11	6–6	4th (East)	
2007–08	Alabama–Huntsville	13–15	6–6	4th (East)	
2008–09	Alabama–Huntsville	17–11	7–5	4th (East)	
2009–10	Alabama–Huntsville	23–7	9–1	1st (East)	NCAA first round
2010–11	Alabama–Huntsville	29–5	11–1	1st (East)	NCAA Elite Eight
2011–12	Alabama–Huntsville	29–4	13–1	1st	NCAA Elite Eight
2012–13	Alabama–Huntsville	25–6	15–3	2nd	NCAA Sweet 16
2013–14	Alabama–Huntsville	15–13	11–9	5th	
2014–15	Alabama–Huntsville	23–9	15–7	1st	NCAA first round
2015–16	Alabama–Huntsville	25–8	18–4	1st	NCAA Sweet 16
2016–17	Alabama–Huntsville	26–8	17–5	2nd	NCAA Sweet 16
2017–18	Alabama–Huntsville	16–12	9–11	9th	
2018–19	Alabama–Huntsville	24–8	15–5	3rd	NCAA first round
Alabama–Huntsville:		436–214 (.671)	229–113 (.670)		
Total:		436–214 (.671)			
National champion Postseason invitational champion Conference regular season champion Conference regular season and conference tournament champion Division regular season champion Division regular season and conference tournament champion Conference tournament champion

=== NCAA DI ===
Record table
Season	Team	Overall	Conference	Standing	Postseason
Lipscomb Bisons (Atlantic Sun) (2019–2025)
2019–20	Lipscomb	16–16	9–7	3rd	
2020–21	Lipscomb	15–12	9–6	3rd	
2021–22	Lipscomb	14–19	6–10	4th (West)	
2022–23	Lipscomb	20–13	11–7	5th	
2023–24	Lipscomb	20–12	11–5	T–2nd	
2024–25	Lipscomb	25–10	14–4	T–1st	NCAA Division I Round of 64
Lipscomb:		110–82 (.573)	60–39 (.606)		
Samford Bulldogs (Southern Conference) (2025–present)
2025–26	Samford	18–14	11–7	T–2nd	
2026–27	Samford	0–0	0–0		
Samford:		18–14 (.563)	11–7 (.611)		
Total:		128–96 (.571)			
National champion Postseason invitational champion Conference regular season champion Conference regular season and conference tournament champion Division regular season champion Division regular season and conference tournament champion Conference tournament champion
