= Jacob Ognacevic =

American basketball player

Personal information
- Listed height: 6 ft 8 in (2.03 m)
- Listed weight: 220 lb (100 kg)

Career information
- High school: Sheboygan Lutheran (Sheboygan, Wisconsin)
- College: Valparaiso (2020–2021); Lipscomb (2021–2025); Washington (2025–2026)
- NBA draft: 2026: undrafted
- Position: Power forward

Career highlights
- Atlantic Sun Player of the Year (2025); 2x First-team All-Atlantic Sun (2023, 2025)

Jacob Ognacevic is an American basketball player. He played college basketball for the Valparaiso Crusaders, Lipscomb Bisons and Washington Huskies.

== High school career ==
Ognacevic attended Sheboygan Lutheran High School in Sheboygan, Wisconsin. As a junior, he averaged 30.2 points and 15.7 rebounds per game. The following year as a senior, he averaged 39.4 points and 16.1 rebounds per game. He committed to play college basketball at Valparaiso University.

== College career ==
As a freshman at Valparaiso, Ognacevic appeared in 28 games and averaged 6.3 points per game, before entering the transfer portal. He transferred to Lipscomb University and in his debut with the Bisons, he totaled 30 points and seven rebounds in a win over Birmingham–Southern. In Ognacevic's first season with Lipscomb, he made an instant impact. After averaging 17.7 points per game during the 2022–23 season, he suffered a knee injury and was forced to take a medical redshirt and miss the entirety of the 2023–24 season. He returned to Lipscomb for the 2024–25 season and emerged as the Atlantic Sun Conference's leading scorer.

== Career statistics ==
Legend
GP	Games played	GS	Games started	MPG	Minutes per game
FG%	Field goal percentage	3P%	3-point field goal percentage	FT%	Free throw percentage
RPG	Rebounds per game	APG	Assists per game	SPG	Steals per game
BPG	Blocks per game	PPG	Points per game	**Bold**	Career high

=== College ===
Year	Team	GP	GS	MPG	FG%	3P%	FT%	RPG	APG	SPG	BPG	PPG
2020–21	Valparaiso	28	0	12.9	.545	**.517**	.676	2.0	.2	.1	.1	6.3
2021–22	Lipscomb	32	9	19.0	.548	.460	.759	4.0	.3	.2	**.4**	11.2
2022–23	Lipscomb	33	26	26.6	**.607**	.295	**.852**	4.4	.6	.2	.3	17.7
2023–24	Lipscomb	Redshirt										
2024–25	Lipscomb	**35**	**35**	**33.7**	.575	.402	.800	**8.0**	**1.4**	**.3**	**.4**	**20.0**
2025–26	Washington	12	1	12.5	.481	.444	.600	1.2	.3	**.3**	0	3.1
Career		140	71	22.7	.575	.407	.794	4.5	.6	.2	.3	13.2
