= Queens Royals =

Intercollegiate sports teams of Queens University of Charlotte

- University: Queens University of Charlotte
- Nickname: Royals
- NCAA: Division I
- Conference: Atlantic Sun Conference (primary); MIVA (men's volleyball); Mountain Pacific Sports Federation (field hockey)
- Athletic director: Cherie Swarthout
- Location: Charlotte, North Carolina
- Varsity teams: 29 (13 men's, 14 women's, 2 co-ed)
- Basketball arena: Curry Arena
- Baseball stadium: Stick Williams Dream Baseball Field
- Softball stadium: Stick Williams Dream Softball Field
- Soccer stadium: Sports Complex at Marion Diehl Park
- Aquatics center: Levine Aquatic Center
- Tennis venue: Howard Levine Tennis Center
- Colors: Navy blue and vegas gold
- Mascot: Rex the Lion
- Website: queensathletics.com

Team NCAA championships
- 14

The Queens Royals are the athletic teams that represent Queens University of Charlotte, located in Charlotte, North Carolina, United States, in NCAA intercollegiate sporting competitions. On July 1, 2022, the Royals began a four-year transition from NCAA Division II to Division I as new members of the Atlantic Sun Conference (then officially known as the ASUN Conference). Before then, Queens had competed in the South Atlantic Conference (SAC) for 20 of their varsity sports; the men's and women's swimming and diving teams competed in the Bluegrass Mountain Conference and the men's volleyball team competed in the Independent Volleyball Association, a scheduling alliance among schools that are independents in that sport's National Collegiate division. (Note: The NCAA uses the "National Collegiate" branding for championship events in sports whose championship events are open to members of more than one NCAA division. It considers a National Collegiate championship equivalent to one in Division I.) Queens had been a member of the SAC since 2013, when it moved from Conference Carolinas.

On May 7, 2022, Queens announced it had accepted an invitation from the ASUN Conference and would join the league on July 1. The ASUN officially announced this move three days later. The men's volleyball team joined the Midwestern Intercollegiate Volleyball Association in July 2023 after having played the 2023 season (2022–23 school year) in the Independent Volleyball Association, a loose affiliation of schools not affiliated with an NCAA-recognized men's volleyball conference.

== Conference affiliations ==
NCAA

- Conference Carolinas (1995–2013)
- South Atlantic Conference (2013–2022)
- ASUN Conference (2022–present)

== Varsity teams ==
Sports that are not recognized by the NCAA in any form are indicated with a yellow background. Sports that do not have NCAA-organized championship events, but are part of the NCAA Emerging Sports for Women program, have a light blue background.

Men's sports	Women's sports
Baseball	Basketball
Basketball	Cross country
Cross country	Field hockey
Golf	Golf
Lacrosse	Lacrosse
Rugby	Rugby
Soccer	Soccer
Swimming and diving	Softball
Tennis	Swimming and diving
Track and field^{†}	Tennis
Triathlon	Track and field^{†}
Volleyball	Triathlon
Wrestling	Volleyball
† – Track and field includes both indoor and outdoor

In addition to the listed sports, Queens considers its cheerleaders, both male and female, as well as its all-female dance team, to be varsity athletes.

== National championships ==
The Royals have won 14 NCAA Division II team national championships.

=== Teams ===
Association	Division	Sport	Year	Opponent/Runner-up	Score
NCAA (10)	Division II (10)	Men's Swimming and Diving (5)	2015	Drury	433.5–417.5 (+16)
NCAA (10)	Division II (10)	Men's Swimming and Diving (5)	2016	Lindenwood	449–382.5 (+66.5)
NCAA (10)	Division II (10)	Men's Swimming and Diving (5)	2017	Drury	563.5–350 (+213.5)
NCAA (10)	Division II (10)	Men's Swimming and Diving (5)	2018	California Baptist	558–307 (+251)
NCAA (10)	Division II (10)	Men's Swimming and Diving (5)	2019	Delta State	606–354.5 (+251.5)
NCAA (10)	Division II (10)	Women's Swimming and Diving (5)	2015	Drury	540.5–489.5 (+51)
NCAA (10)	Division II (10)	Women's Swimming and Diving (5)	2016	Wingate	567–364.5 (+202.5)
NCAA (10)	Division II (10)	Women's Swimming and Diving (5)	2017	Drury	467–385 (+82)
NCAA (10)	Division II (10)	Women's Swimming and Diving (5)	2018	Drury	574.5–401 (+173.5)
NCAA (10)	Division II (10)	Women's Swimming and Diving (5)	2019	Drury	707.5–345 (+362.5)
USA Rugby Fall College 15s	Division II	Men's Rugby	2019	Wisconsin–Whitewater	74–8

== Facilities ==
=== Levine Center for Wellness and Recreation ===
The Levine Center for Wellness and Recreation is located on campus and contains Curry Arena, the aquatic center, as well as office and practice space. The facility is home to the basketball, swimming & diving, volleyball, and wrestling programs and was built in 2012 to replace the Ovens Athletic Center.

=== Queens University of Charlotte Sports Complex at Marion Diehl Park ===
A joint project of Queens University of Charlotte and Mecklenburg County Parks & Recreation, the Sports Complex is home to Dickson Field, a 2,000-seat stadium that serves as home to the lacrosse, rugby, and soccer teams, Bessant Field, which hosts the field hockey program and also contains an eight-lane track, a tennis complex, and several community facilities. A notable feature of the complex is Rex, the world's largest standing lion statue.
