= Southern Conference Men's Basketball Coach of the Year =

College basketball award

Southern Conference Coach of the Year
- Awarded for: the best coach in the Southern Conference.

History
- First award: 1947
- Most recent: Brooks Savage, East Tennessee State

The Southern Conference Men's Basketball Coach of the Year is an annual college basketball award presented to the top men's basketball coach in the Southern Conference.

== Key ==
^{C}	SoCon coaches' selection (1989–2024)
^{M}	SoCon media's selection (1989–2024)
Coach (X)	Denotes the number of times the player has been awarded the SoCon Coach of the Year award at that point

== Winners ==
Season	Coach	School	Source(s)
1946–47	Everett Case	NC State	
1947–48	Gerry Gerard	Duke	
1948–49	Everett Case (2)	NC State (2)	
1949–50	Gerry Gerard (2)	Duke (2)	
1950–51	Everett Case (3)	NC State (3)	
1951–52	Red Brown	West Virginia	
1952–53	Murray Greason	Wake Forest	
1953–54	Bill Reinhart	George Washington	
1954–55	Fred Schaus	West Virginia (2)	
1955–56	Chuck Noe	Virginia Tech	
1956–57	Norm Sloan	The Citadel	
1957–58	Fred Schaus (2)	West Virginia (3)	
1958–59	Fred Schaus (3)	West Virginia (4)	
1959–60	Fred Schaus (4)	West Virginia (5)	
1960–61	George King	West Virginia (6)	
1961–62	Chuck Noe (2)	Virginia Tech (2)	
1962–63	Lefty Driesell	Davidson	
1963–64	Lefty Driesell (2)	Davidson (2)	
1964–65	Lefty Driesell (3)	Davidson (3)	
1965–66	Lefty Driesell (4)	Davidson (4)	
1966–67	Bucky Waters	West Virginia (7)	
1967–68	Lewis Mills	Richmond	
1968–69	Tom Quinn	East Carolina	
1969–70	Terry Holland	Davidson (5)	
1970–71	Terry Holland (2)	Davidson (6)	
1971–72	Terry Holland (3)	Davidson (7)	
1972–73	Joe Williams	Furman	
1973–74	Lewis Mills (2)	Richmond (2)	
1974–75	Dave Patton	East Carolina (2)	
1975–76	Bobby Cremins	Appalachian State	
1976–77	Charlie Schmaus	VMI	
1977–78	Bobby Cremins (2)	Appalachian State (2)	
1978–79	Les Robinson	The Citadel (2)	
1979–80	Steve Cottrell	Western Carolina	
1980–81	Bobby Cremins (3)	Appalachian State (3)	
1981–82	Murray Arnold	Chattanooga	
1982–83	Murray Arnold (2)	Chattanooga (2)	
1983–84	Rick Huckabay	Marshall	
1984–85	Marty Fletcher	VMI (2)	
1985–86	Mack McCarthy	Chattanooga (3)	
1986–87	Butch Estes	Furman (2)	
1987–88	Tom Apke	Appalachian State (4)	
1988–89	Randy Nesbit	The Citadel (3)	
1989–90	Les Robinson	East Tennessee State	
1989–90	Dana Altman^{C}	Marshall (2)	
1990–91	Butch Estes (2)	Furman (3)	
1991–92	Mack McCarthy (2)	Chattanooga (4)	
1992–93	Mack McCarthy (3)	Chattanooga (5)	
1993–94	Bob McKillop	Davidson (8)	
1994–95	Bart Bellairs^{C}	VMI (3)	
1994–95	Billy Donovan^{M}	Marshall (3)	
1995–96	Bob McKillop (2)	Davidson (9)	
1996–97	Bob McKillop^{C} (3)	Davidson (10)	
1996–97	Greg White^{M}	Marshall (4)	
1997–98	Buzz Peterson	Appalachian State (5)	
1998–99	John Kresse	Charleston	
1999–00	Buzz Peterson^{C} (2)	Appalachian State (6)	
1999–00	Jeff Price^{M}	Georgia Southern	
2000–01	Ed DeChellis	East Tennessee State (2)	
2001–02	Ed DeChellis^{C} (2)	East Tennessee State (3)	
2001–02	Bob McKillop^{M} (4)	Davidson (11)	
2002–03	Houston Fancher	Appalachian State (7)	
2003–04	Murry Bartow	East Tennessee State (4)	
2004–05	Bob McKillop (5)	Davidson (12)	
2005–06	Ernie Nestor	Elon	
2006–07	Bob McKillop (6)	Davidson (13)	
2007–08	Bob McKillop (7)	Davidson (14)	
2008–09	Ed Conroy	The Citadel (4)	
2009–10	Mike Young	Wofford	
2010–11	Bobby Cremins	Charleston (2)	
2011–12	Bob McKillop^{C} (8)	Davidson (15)	
2011–12	Wes Miller^{M}	UNC Greensboro	
2012–13	Bob McKillop^{C} (9)	Davidson (16)	
2012–13	Matt Matheny^{M}	Elon (2)	
2013–14	Mike Young^{C} (2)	Wofford (2)	
2013–14	Will Wade^{M}	Chattanooga (6)	
2014–15	Mike Young (3)	Wofford (3)	
2015–16	Matt McCall	Chattanooga (7)	
2016–17	Niko Medved	Furman (4)	
2017–18	Wes Miller (2)	UNC Greensboro (2)	
2018–19	Mike Young (4)	Wofford (4)	
2019–20	Steve Forbes	East Tennessee State (5)	
2020–21	Dan Earl	VMI (4)	
2021–22	Lamont Paris^{C}	Chattanooga (8)	
2021–22	Bucky McMillan^{M}	Samford	
2022–23	Mike Jones^{C}	UNC Greensboro (3)	
2022–23	Bucky McMillan^{M} (2)	Samford (2)	
2023–24	Bucky McMillan (3)	Samford (3)	
2024–25	Dan Earl (2)	Chattanooga (9)	
2025–26	Brooks Savage	East Tennessee State (6)	

== Winners by school ==
School	Winners	Years
Davidson (Note: Davidson left in 2014 to join the Atlantic 10 Conference (A10).)	16	1963, 1964, 1965, 1966, 1970, 1971, 1972, 1994, 1996, 1997, 2002, 2005, 2007, 2008, 2012, 2013
Chattanooga	9	1982, 1983, 1986, 1992, 1993, 2014, 2016, 2022, 2025
Appalachian State (Note: Appalachian State left in 2014 to join the Sun Belt Conference.)	7	1976, 1978, 1981, 1988, 1998, 2000, 2003
West Virginia (Note: West Virginia left in 1968 to become an independent. The Mountaineers are now in the Big 12 Conference.)	7	1952, 1955, 1958, 1959, 1960, 1961, 1967
East Tennessee State (Note: East Tennessee State left in 2005 to join the Atlantic Sun Conference and returned in 2014.)	6	1990, 2001, 2002, 2004, 2020, 2026
The Citadel	4	1957, 1979, 1989, 2009
Furman	4	1973, 1987, 1991, 2017
Marshall (Note: Marshall left in 1997 to join the Mid-American Conference. The Thundering Herd are now in Conference USA (C-USA).)	4	1984, 1990, 1995, 1997
VMI (Note: VMI left in 2003 to join the Big South Conference and returned in 2014.)	4	1977, 1985, 1995, 2021
Wofford	4	2010, 2014, 2015, 2019
UNC Greensboro	3	2012, 2018, 2023
NC State (Note: NC State left in 1953 to join the Atlantic Coast Conference (ACC).)	3	1947, 1949, 1951
Samford	3	2022, 2023, 2024
Charleston (Note: Charleston left in 2013 to join the Coastal Athletic Association (CAA).)	2	1999, 2011
Duke (Note: Duke left in 1953 to join the Atlantic Coast Conference (ACC).)	2	1948, 1950
East Carolina (Note: East Carolina left in 1976 to become an independent. The Pirates are now in the American Athletic Conference.)	2	1969, 1975
Elon (Note: Elon left in 2014 to join the CAA.)	2	2006, 2013
Richmond (Note: Richmond left in 1976 to become an independent. The Spiders are now in the A10.)	2	1968, 1974
Virginia Tech (Note: Virginia Tech left in 1965 to become an independent. The Hokies are now in the Atlantic Coast Conference (ACC).)	2	1956, 1962
George Washington (Note: George Washington left in 1970 to become an independent. The Revolutionaries are now in the Atlantic 10 Conference (A10).)	1	1954
Georgia Southern (Note: Georgia Southern left in 2014 to join the Sun Belt Conference.)	1	2000
Wake Forest (Note: Wake Forest left in 1953 to join the Atlantic Coast Conference (ACC).)	1	1952
Western Carolina	1	1980
