= 2023–24 East Tennessee State Buccaneers men's basketball team =

American college basketball season

2023–24 East Tennessee State Buccaneers men's basketball
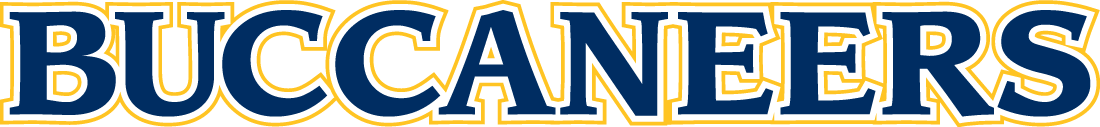
- Conference: Southern Conference
- Record: 19–16 (8–10 SoCon)
- Head coach: Brooks Savage (1st season)
- Assistant coaches: Kris Arkenberg; Joe Hugley; Brian Jones
- Home arena: Freedom Hall Civic Center

2023–24 Southern Conference men's basketball standings
	Conf.				Overall
Team	W		L	PCT	W		L	PCT
Samford †	15	–	3	.833	29	–	6	.829
UNC Greensboro	12	–	6	.667	21	–	11	.656
Chattanooga	12	–	6	.667	21	–	12	.636
Western Carolina	11	–	7	.611	22	–	10	.688
Furman	10	–	8	.556	17	–	16	.515
Wofford	10	–	8	.556	17	–	15	.531
East Tennessee State	8	–	10	.444	19	–	16	.543
Mercer	8	–	10	.444	16	–	17	.485
The Citadel	3	–	15	.167	11	–	21	.344
VMI	1	–	17	.056	4	–	28	.125
† 2024 SoCon tournament winner

The 2023–24 East Tennessee State Buccaneers men's basketball team represented East Tennessee State University in the 2023–24 NCAA Division I men's basketball season. The Buccaneers, led by first-year head coach Brooks Savage, played their home games at the Freedom Hall Civic Center in Johnson City, Tennessee, as members of the Southern Conference (SoCon). They finished the season 19–16, 8–10 in SoCon play, to finish in a tie for seventh place. They defeated VMI, UNC Greensboro and Chattanooga to advance to the championship game of the SoCon tournament where they lost to Samford.

== Previous season ==
The Buccaneers finished the 2022–23 season 12–20, 8–10 in SoCon play, to finish tied for fifth place. They lost to Western Carolina in the quarterfinals of the SoCon tournament.

Following the end of the season, head coach Desmond Oliver was fired. He had a record of 27–37 after two seasons. On March 20, 2023, Brooks Savage was hired as his replacement.

== Offseason ==
=== Departing players ===
Departing players
Name	Number	Position	Height	Weight	Year	Hometown	Reason for departure
Jeremy Gregory	0	F	6' 6"	230	Freshman	Charlotte, NC	Transferred to Chipola College
Jamarius Hairston	1	G	6' 3"	193	Graduate student	Salisbury, NC	Completed college eligibility
Jordan King	2	G	6' 0"	175	Junior	Albany, NY	Transferred to Richmond
Deanthony Tipler	3	G	5' 10"	170	Senior	Ashland, MS	Graduated, transferred to UT Rio Grande Valley
Kristian Shaw	4	G	6' 5"	205	Freshman	Hendersonville, TN	Transferred to Volunteer State CC
Josh Taylor	10	F	6' 8"	205	Junior	Atlanta, GA	Transferred to St. Thomas
Jalen Haynes	11	F	6' 8"	255	Sophomore	Fort Lauderdale, FL	Transferred to George Mason
Brock Jancek	13	F	6' 8"	225	Graduate student	Knoxville, TN	Completed college eligibility
Cameron George	15	G	6' 3"	185	Sophomore	Knoxville, TN	Walk-on, transferred to King University
Kordell Charles	20	F	6' 8"	205	Sophomore	Ontario, Canada	Transferred to Northeastern Oklahoma A&M

=== Incoming transfers ===
Incoming transfers
Name	Number	Position	Height	Weight	Year	Hometown	Previous school
Karon Boyd	0	G	6' 5"	220	Sophomore	Concord, NC	USC Aiken
Quimari Peterson	1	G	6' 1"	185	Junior	Gary, IN	John A. Logan College
Tyler Rice	3	G	6' 1"	180	Junior	Columbia, SC	William & Mary
DJ Hughes	10	F	6' 6"	230	Junior	Indianapolis, IN	Butler
Ebby Asamoah	14	G	6' 4"	200	Graduate student	Rockville, MD	Delaware
Jadyn Parker	24	F	6' 10"	200	RS Junior	Shallotte, NC	North Florida

=== 2023 recruiting class ===
College recruiting information
Name	Hometown	School	Height	Weight	Commit date
Maki Johnson; SG	Huntington, WV	Huntington Prep School	6 ft 4 in (1.93 m)	180 lb (82 kg)	Mar 31, 2023
Maki Johnson; SG	Recruit ratings: Scout: Rivals: 247Sports: ESPN: (78)				
Gabe Sisk; SG	Louisville, KY	Ballard High School (KY)	6 ft 6 in (1.98 m)	180 lb (82 kg)	May 30, 2023
Gabe Sisk; SG	Recruit ratings: Scout: Rivals: 247Sports: ESPN: (81)				
David Meriweather; C	Indianapolis, IN	Lawrence North High School	6 ft 10 in (2.08 m)	230 lb (100 kg)	Sep 14, 2023
David Meriweather; C	Recruit ratings: Scout: Rivals: 247Sports: ESPN:				
Overall recruit ranking:
Note: In many cases, Scout, Rivals, 247Sports, On3, and ESPN may conflict in their listings of height and weight.; In these cases, the average was taken. ESPN grades are on a 100-point scale.; Sources: "2023 Team Ranking". Rivals.

== Roster ==
2023–24 East Tennessee State Buccaneers men's basketball team
Players
Coaches

Pos.	#	Name	Height	Weight	Year	Hometown
F	0	Karon Boyd	6 ft 5 in (1.96 m)	220 lb (100 kg)	So	Concord, NC
G	1	Quimari Peterson	6 ft 1 in (1.85 m)	185 lb (84 kg)	Jr	Gary, IN
G	2	Maki Johnson	6 ft 4 in (1.93 m)	180 lb (82 kg)	Fr	Huntington, WV
G	3	Tyler Rice	6 ft 1 in (1.85 m)	180 lb (82 kg)	Jr	Columbia, SC
G	4	Timmy Fasehun (W)	6 ft 0 in (1.83 m)	175 lb (79 kg)	So	Livingston, NJ
G	5	Allen Strothers	6 ft 1 in (1.85 m)	170 lb (77 kg)	RS So	Newport News, VA
F	10	DJ Hughes	6 ft 6 in (1.98 m)	230 lb (104 kg)	Jr	Indianapolis, IN
C	11	David Meriweather	6 ft 10 in (2.08 m)	230 lb (104 kg)	Fr	Indianapolis, IN
G	12	Justice Smith	6 ft 6 in (1.98 m)	215 lb (98 kg)	RS Jr	Lyons, NY
G	14	Ebby Asamoah	6 ft 4 in (1.93 m)	200 lb (91 kg)	GS	Rockville, MD
G	15	Jaxson Jones (W)	6 ft 4 in (1.93 m)	190 lb (86 kg)	Fr	Council Bluffs, IA
G	21	Gabe Sisk	6 ft 6 in (1.98 m)	180 lb (82 kg)	Fr	Louisville, KY
F	22	Jaden Seymour	6 ft 8 in (2.03 m)	205 lb (93 kg)	Jr	Charlotte, NC
F	23	Braden Ilic	6 ft 9 in (2.06 m)	225 lb (102 kg)	So	Morristown, TN
F	24	Jadyn Parker	6 ft 10 in (2.08 m)	200 lb (91 kg)	RS Jr	Shallotte, NC

Head coach

- Brooks Savage (Tennessee)

Assistant coach(es)

- Kris Arkenberg (IUPUI)
- Joe Hugley (East Tennessee State)
- Brian Jones (Northern Iowa)

Legend

- (C) Team captain
- (S) Suspended
- (I) Ineligible
- (W) Walk-on
- Injured
- Current redshirt

Roster
Last update: October 1, 2024

== Schedule and results ==
Date time, TV	Rank^{#}	Opponent^{#}	Result	Record	Site (attendance) city, state
Exhibition
October 30, 2023*; 7:00 p.m.		Virginia–Wise	W 105–55	–	Freedom Hall Civic Center (1,967); Johnson City, TN
Non-conference regular season
November 6, 2023*; 7:00 p.m., ESPN+		King	W 73–56	1–0	Freedom Hall Civic Center (2,736); Johnson City, TN
November 9, 2023*; 7:00 p.m., FloHoops		at Elon	L 76–79	1–1	Schar Center (1,514); Elon, NC
November 13, 2023*; 7:00 p.m., CBSSN		at Butler	L 47–81	1–2	Hinkle Fieldhouse (6,511); Indianapolis, IN
November 17, 2023*; 7:00 p.m., ESPN+		Davidson	W 70–68	2–2	Freedom Hall Civic Center (4,479); Johnson City, TN
November 22, 2023*; 7:00 p.m., ESPN+		at Cleveland State; Viking Invitational	L 70–72	2–3	Woodling Gym (1,412); Cleveland, OH
November 24, 2023*; 4:00 p.m., ESPN+		vs. Alabama A&M; Viking Invitational	W 81–72	3–3	Woodling Gym (597); Cleveland, OH
November 29, 2023*; 6:30 p.m., ESPN+		at Appalachian State	L 61–72	3–4	Holmes Center (1,813); Boone, NC
December 3, 2023*; 3:00 p.m., ESPN+		at Jacksonville State	W 61–59	4–4	Pete Mathews Coliseum (1,203); Jacksonville, AL
December 10, 2023*; 4:00 p.m., ESPN+		Tennessee Tech	W 73–72	5–4	Freedom Hall Civic Center (4,121); Johnson City, TN
December 15, 2023*; 7:00 p.m., ESPN+		Tusculum	W 105–43	6–4	Freedom Hall Civic Center (2,379); Johnson City, TN
December 20, 2023*; 7:30 p.m., ESPN+		Kansas City	W 70–57	7–4	Freedom Hall Civic Center (3,281); Johnson City, TN
December 22, 2023*; 9:00 p.m.		at Utah State	L 65–80	7–5	Smith Spectrum (6,804); Logan, UT
December 29, 2023*; 7:00 p.m., ESPN+		at East Carolina	W 86–70	8–5	Williams Arena (4,259); Greenville, NC
SoCon Regular season
January 3, 2024; 7:00 p.m., ESPN+		Mercer	W 80–69	9–5 (1–0)	Freedom Hall Civic Center (3,529); Johnson City, TN
January 6, 2024; 4:00 p.m., ESPN+		at UNC Greensboro	L 54–70	9–6 (1–1)	Greensboro Coliseum (1,182); Greensboro, NC
January 10, 2024; 7:00 p.m., ESPN+		Western Carolina	L 66–80	9–7 (1–2)	Freedom Hall Civic Center (3,423); Johnson City, TN
January 13, 2024; 4:00 p.m., ESPN+		at Furman	L 73–82	9–8 (1–3)	Timmons Arena (2,279); Greenville, SC
January 17, 2024; 7:00 p.m., ESPN+		at Wofford	L 73–75	9–9 (1–4)	Jerry Richardson Indoor Stadium (1,182); Spartanburg, SC
January 21, 2024; 3:00 p.m., ESPN2		Chattanooga	L 74–81	9–10 (1–5)	Freedom Hall Civic Center (4,869); Johnson City, TN
January 24, 2024; 7:00 p.m., ESPN+		at VMI	W 74–73	10–10 (2–5)	Cameron Hall (882); Lexington, VA
January 27, 2024; 4:00 p.m., ESPN+		Samford	L 72–75	10–11 (2–6)	Freedom Hall Civic Center (4,043); Johnson City, TN
January 31, 2024; 7:00 p.m., ESPN+		at Mercer	W 54–49	11–11 (3–6)	Hawkins Arena (2,163); Macon, GA
February 3, 2024; 4:00 p.m., ESPN+		The Citadel	W 62–60	12–11 (4–6)	Freedom Hall Civic Center (3,615); Johnson City, TN
February 7, 2024; 7:00 p.m., ESPN+		Wofford	W 57–50	13–11 (5–6)	Freedom Hall Civic Center (3,421); Johnson City, TN
February 10, 2024; 6:00 p.m., CBSSN		Furman	L 63–65	13–12 (5–7)	Freedom Hall Civic Center (4,566); Johnson City, TN
February 14, 2024; 7:00 p.m., ESPN+		at Chattanooga	L 71–84	13–13 (5–8)	McKenzie Arena (3,025); Chattanooga, TN
February 17, 2024; 4:00 p.m., ESPN+		at Western Carolina	L 65–70	13–14 (5–9)	Ramsey Center (3,231); Cullowhee, NC
February 21, 2024; 7:00 p.m., ESPN+		VMI	W 82–69	14–14 (6–9)	Freedom Hall Civic Center (3,325); Johnson City, TN
February 24, 2024; 3:00 p.m., ESPN+		at Samford	L 71–87	14–15 (6–10)	Pete Hanna Center (4,523); Homewood, AL
February 28, 2024; 7:00 p.m., ESPN+		at The Citadel	W 81–63	15–15 (7–10)	McAlister Field House (1,973); Charleston, SC
March 2, 2024; 4:00 p.m., ESPN+		UNC Greensboro	W 66–65	16–15 (8–10)	Freedom Hall Civic Center (4,451); Johnson City, TN
SoCon tournament
March 8, 2024; 7:30 p.m., ESPN+	(7)	vs. (10) VMI; First round	W 98–66	17–15	Harrah's Cherokee Center (2,484); Asheville, NC
March 9, 2024; 2:30 p.m., ESPN+	(7)	vs. (2) UNC Greensboro; Quarterfinals	W 73–62	18–15	Harrah's Cherokee Center (4,194); Asheville, NC
March 10, 2024; 6:30 p.m., ESPNU	(7)	vs. (3) Chattanooga; Semifinals	W 85–84 ^{OT}	19–15	Harrah's Cherokee Center (3,992); Asheville, NC
March 11, 2024; 7:00 p.m., ESPN	(7)	vs. (1) Samford; Championship	L 69–76	19–16	Harrah's Cherokee Center (5,112); Asheville, NC
*Non-conference game. ^{#}Rankings from AP poll. (#) Tournament seedings in parentheses. All times are in Eastern.
