= Buckyball (disambiguation) =

A buckyball or buckminsterfullerene is a molecule resembling a soccer ball composed of 60 carbon atoms.

Buckyball may also refer to:

- Truncated icosahedron, the geometric structure of the C_{60} molecule
- A brand of neodymium magnet toys
- Bucky McMillan, an American basketball coach

== See also ==
- Fullerene, any molecule composed of carbon in the form of a hollow sphere, ellipsoid, tube, and many other shapes
