= 2023–24 Samford Bulldogs men's basketball team =

American college basketball season

2023–24 Samford Bulldogs men's basketball

SoCon regular-season champions SoCon tournament champions

NCAA tournament, first round
- Conference: Southern Conference
- Record: 29–6 (15–3 SoCon)
- Head coach: Bucky McMillan (4th season)
- Assistant coaches: Mitch Cole; Danny Young; Neb Exantus
- Home arena: Pete Hanna Center

2023–24 Southern Conference men's basketball standings
	Conf.				Overall
Team	W		L	PCT	W		L	PCT
Samford †	15	–	3	.833	29	–	6	.829
UNC Greensboro	12	–	6	.667	21	–	11	.656
Chattanooga	12	–	6	.667	21	–	12	.636
Western Carolina	11	–	7	.611	22	–	10	.688
Furman	10	–	8	.556	17	–	16	.515
Wofford	10	–	8	.556	17	–	15	.531
East Tennessee State	8	–	10	.444	19	–	16	.543
Mercer	8	–	10	.444	16	–	17	.485
The Citadel	3	–	15	.167	11	–	21	.344
VMI	1	–	17	.056	4	–	28	.125
† 2024 SoCon tournament winner

The 2023–24 Samford Bulldogs men's basketball team represented Samford University in the 2023–24 NCAA Division I men's basketball season. The Bulldogs, led by fourth-year head coach Bucky McMillan, played their home games at the Pete Hanna Center in Homewood, Alabama as a member of the Southern Conference (SoCon). They finished the season 29–6, 15–3 in SoCon play, to win the regular-season championship. As No. 1 seed in the SoCon tournament, they defeated Mercer, Furman and East Tennessee State to win the conference championship. As a result, they received the conference's automatic bid to the NCAA tournament for the third time in school history and first since 2000. As the No. 13 seed in the Midwest region, they lost to Kansas in the first round.

== Previous season ==
The Bulldogs finished the 2022–23 season 21–11, 15–3 in SoCon play, to finish in as the regular-season conference champions. They lost to Chattanooga in the quarterfinals of the Southern Conference tournament.

== Roster ==
2023–24 Samford Bulldogs men's basketball team
Players
Coaches

Pos.	#	Name	Height	Weight	Year	Hometown
G	0	Lukas Walls	6 ft 5 in (1.96 m)	203 lb (92 kg)	Fr	Knoxville, TN
G	1	Josh Holloway	6 ft 2 in (1.88 m)	160 lb (73 kg)	Fr	Memphis, TN
G	2	Jaden Campbell	6 ft 5 in (1.96 m)	200 lb (91 kg)	Sr	Brampton, ON
G	3	Chandler Leopard	6 ft 3 in (1.91 m)	195 lb (88 kg)	GS	Athens, AL
F	4	Jermaine Marshall	6 ft 6 in (1.98 m)	225 lb (102 kg)	Sr	Brighton, AL
G	5	A.J. Staton-McCray	6 ft 5 in (1.96 m)	195 lb (88 kg)	Jr	Delray Beach, FL
G	10	Garrett Hicks	6 ft 0 in (1.83 m)	165 lb (75 kg)	GS	Madison, AL
G/F	11	Jonathan Caicedo	6 ft 7 in (2.01 m)	214 lb (97 kg)	Fr	Tampa, FL
G	12	Dallas Graziani	5 ft 8 in (1.73 m)	140 lb (64 kg)	So	Pembroke Pines, FL
G	13	Paulie Stramaglia	5 ft 11 in (1.8 m)	185 lb (84 kg)	So	Mountain Brook, AL
F	14	Achor Achor	6 ft 9 in (2.06 m)	227 lb (103 kg)	Jr	Melbourne, Australia
F	15	Grayson Walters	6 ft 5 in (1.96 m)	210 lb (95 kg)	Sr	Mountain Brook, AL
G	21	Rylan Jones	6 ft 0 in (1.83 m)	175 lb (79 kg)	GS	Logan, UT
G	22	Thomas Kizer	6 ft 0 in (1.83 m)	165 lb (75 kg)	Fr	Memphis, TN
G	23	Owen LaRocca	6 ft 1 in (1.85 m)	160 lb (73 kg)	Jr	Sugar Land, TX
G	24	Brody Boyer	6 ft 4 in (1.93 m)	210 lb (95 kg)	Sr	Palm Bay, FL
F	25	Nathan Johnson	6 ft 7 in (2.01 m)	205 lb (93 kg)	GS	Adel, IA
F	31	Joshua Hughes	6 ft 5 in (1.96 m)	215 lb (98 kg)	So	Woodstock, GA
F/C	32	Zach Loveday	7 ft 0 in (2.13 m)	240 lb (109 kg)	Sr	Gallipolis, OH
F/C	35	Riley Allenspach	6 ft 11 in (2.11 m)	247 lb (112 kg)	Fr	Charlotte, NC

Head coach

- Bucky McMillan (Birmingham–Southern)

Assistant coach(es)

- Mitch Cole (Montana State Billings)
- Danny Young (Grand Canyon)
- Neb Exantus (Southern New Hampshire)

Legend

- (C) Team captain
- (S) Suspended
- (I) Ineligible
- (W) Walk-on
- Injured
- Current redshirt

Roster
Last update: October 22, 2024

== Schedule and results ==
Date time, TV	Rank^{#}	Opponent^{#}	Result	Record	High points	High rebounds	High assists	Site (attendance) city, state
Non-conference regular season
November 6, 2023*; 6:30 p.m., BTN		at No. 3 Purdue	L 45–98	0–1	11 – Campbell	7 – Achor	2 – tied	Mackey Arena (14,876); West Lafayette, IN
November 10, 2023*; 6:00 p.m., ESPN+		at VCU	L 65–75	0–2	20 – Marshall	10 – Marshall	4 – Holloway	Siegel Center (7,114); Richmond, VA
November 14, 2023*; 6:30 p.m., ESPN+		Mississippi College	W 96–52	1–2	17 – Achor	7 – tied	3 – tied	Pete Hanna Center (1,732); Homewood, AL
November 17, 2023*; 6:30 p.m., ESPN+		South Carolina State	W 89–72	2–2	20 – Marshall	14 – Achor	5 – Holloway	Pete Hanna Center (1,023); Homewood, AL
November 22, 2023*; 4:30 p.m., ESPN+		Alabama State; Samford MTE	W 99–67	3–2	17 – Campbell	7 – Staton-McCray	6 – tied	Pete Hanna Center (866); Homewood, AL
November 24, 2023*; 1:00 p.m., ESPN+		Merrimack; Samford MTE	W 79–71	4–2	19 – Campbell	8 – Achor	4 – tied	Pete Hanna Center (818); Homewood, AL
November 25, 2023*; 2:00 p.m., ESPN+		North Carolina A&T; Samford MTE	W 101–83	5–2	26 – Achor	7 – Loveday	6 – Jones	Pete Hanna Center (411); Homewood, AL
November 30, 2023*; 7:00 p.m., ESPN+		Louisiana	W 88–65	6–2	25 – Achor	8 – Achor	9 – Jones	Pete Hanna Center (1,471); Homewood, AL
December 3, 2023*; 3:30 p.m., ESPN+		LaGrange	W 128–82	7–2	21 – Leopard	8 – Achor	7 – Holloway	Pete Hanna Center (879); Homewood, AL
December 11, 2023*; 6:30pm, ESPN+		Alabama A&M	W 118–91	8–2	18 – Staton-McCray	6 – Staton-McCray	5 – tied	Pete Hanna Center (1,763); Homewood, AL
December 16, 2023*; 2:00 p.m., ESPN+		Belmont	W 99–93	9–2	19 – Staton-McCray	12 – Marshall	7 – Jones	Pete Hanna Center (2,196); Homewood, AL
December 19, 2023*; 1:00 p.m., ESPN+		at Valparaiso	W 79–61	10–2	15 – Hicks	6 – Staton-McCray	7 – Jones	Athletics–Recreation Center (1,100); Valparaiso, IN
December 21, 2023*; 7:00 p.m., YouTube		at Texas Southern	W 87–65	11–2	16 – Staton-McCray	8 – Marshall	6 – Jones	Health and Physical Education Arena (754); Houston, TX
SoCon regular season
January 3, 2024; 12:00 p.m., ESPN+		Chattanooga	W 89–74	12–2 (1–0)	29 – Staton-McCray	5 – Staton-McCray	6 – Jones	Pete Hanna Center (1,083); Homewood, AL
January 6, 2024; 1:00 p.m., ESPN+		at The Citadel	W 80–64	13–2 (2–0)	19 – Achor	8 – Allenspach	8 – Jones	McAlister Field House (1,647); Charleston, SC
January 11, 2024; 12:00 p.m., ESPN+		UNC Greensboro	W 79–70	14–2 (3–0)	22 – Achor	9 – Jones	8 – Jones	Pete Hanna Center (2,317); Homewood, AL
January 13, 2024; 12:00 p.m., ESPN+		VMI	W 134–96	15–2 (4–0)	18 – tied	9 – Allenspach	6 – Jones	Pete Hanna Center (3,714); Homewood, AL
January 16, 2024; 7:00 p.m., CBSSN		at Western Carolina	W 75–71	16–2 (5–0)	35 – Achor	10 – Achor	6 – Jones	Ramsey Center (5,018); Cullowhee, NC
January 20, 2024; 12:00 p.m., ESPN+		Mercer	W 87–80	17–2 (6–0)	20 – tied	5 – tied	4 – tied	Pete Hanna Center (2,516); Homewood, AL
January 24, 2024; 7:00 p.m., ESPN+		at Furman	L 68–78	17–3 (6–1)	19 – Achor	6 – Achor	8 – Jones	Timmons Arena (2,207); Greenville, SC
January 27, 2024; 4:00 p.m., ESPN+		at East Tennessee State	W 75–72	18–3 (7–1)	18 – Johnson	7 – Campbell	5 – Jones	Freedom Hall Civic Center (4,043); Johnson City, TN
January 31, 2024; 12:00 p.m., ESPN+		Wofford	W 81–79	19–3 (8–1)	18 – Campbell	8 – Achor	8 – Achor	Pete Hanna Center (2,431); Homewood, AL
February 3, 2024; 4:30 p.m., ESPN+		at Chattanooga	W 78–56	20–3 (9–1)	16 – Campbell	10 – Staton-McCray	3 – Jones	McKenzie Arena (4,000); Chattanooga, TN
February 8, 2024; 7:00 p.m., ESPNU		at UNC Greensboro	W 78–69	21–3 (10–1)	17 – Campbell	7 – Achor	7 – Jones	Greensboro Coliseum (2,023); Greensboro, NC
February 10, 2024; 1:00 p.m., ESPN+		at VMI	W 102–63	22–3 (11–1)	16 – tied	4 – tied	5 – tied	Cameron Hall (3,267); Lexington, VA
February 14, 2024; 12:00 p.m., ESPN2/U		Western Carolina	W 88–62	23–3 (12–1)	18 – Achor	6 – Staton-McCray	5 – Jones	Pete Hanna Center (1,321); Homewood, AL
February 17, 2024; 2:00 p.m., ESPN+		at Mercer	L 84–88	23–4 (12–2)	20 – Achor	9 – Achor	2 – tied	Hawkins Arena (2,901); Macon, GA
February 21, 2024; 12:00 p.m., ESPN+		Furman	W 74–72	24–4 (13–2)	17 – Jones	8 – Marshall	4 – tied	Pete Hanna Center (2,531); Homewood, AL
February 24, 2024; 12:00 p.m., ESPN+		East Tennessee State	W 87–71	25–4 (14–2)	28 – Campbell	5 – tied	5 – Jones	Pete Hanna Center (4,523); Homewood, AL
February 28, 2024; 7:00 p.m., ESPN+		at Wofford	L 69–91	25–5 (14–3)	12 – Allenspach	5 – tied	5 – Holloway	Jerry Richardson Indoor Stadium (1,674); Spartanburg, SC
March 2, 2024; 12:00 p.m., ESPN+		The Citadel	W 92–80	26–5 (15–3)	21 – Achor	7 – Marshall	4 – tied	Pete Hanna Center (−); Homewood, AL
SoCon tournament
March 9, 2024; 11:00 a.m., ESPN+	(1)	vs. (8) Mercer; Quarterfinals	W 70–57	27–5	15 – tied	8 – Marshall	2 – tied	Harrah's Cherokee Center (−); Asheville, NC
March 10, 2024; 3:00 p.m., ESPNU	(1)	vs. (5) Furman; Semifinals	W 84–77	28–5	28 – Achor	14 – Achor	6 – Jones	Harrah's Cherokee Center (−); Asheville, NC
March 11, 2024; 6:00 p.m., ESPN	(1)	vs. (7) East Tennessee State; Championship	W 76–69	29–5	25 – Achor	9 – Achor	4 – Jones	Harrah's Cherokee Center (−); Asheville, NC
NCAA tournament
March 21, 2024; 8:55 p.m., TBS	(13 MW)	vs. (4 MW) No. 17 Kansas; First round	L 89–93	29–6	23 – Achor	8 – Achor	9 – Jones	Delta Center (17,404); Salt Lake City, UT
*Non-conference game. ^{#}Rankings from AP Poll. (#) Tournament seedings in parentheses. MW=Midwest region. All times are in Central.
