= Northern Classic =

NCAA Division I men's college basketball tournament in Laval, Canada

The Northern Classic (French: Classique du Nord) is an NCAA Division I men's college basketball tournament in Laval, Quebec, Canada. First played in 2022, the tournament is held at Laval's Place Bell arena in late November.

The first event took place from November 25–27, 2022.

The second event took place from November 24–26, 2023. The teams involved were: UNC Asheville, Lipscomb, Bowling Green, Western Kentucky, Canisius, and Wofford.

The Northern Classic was not played in 2024. In August 2025, tournament organizers announced that it would be held once again from November 28–30, 2025. Five teams were announced: Albany Great Danes (Division I), Colgate Raiders (Division I), Fordham Rams (Division I), Franklin Pierce Ravens (Division II), and Oneonta State Red Dragons (Division III).
