= 2024 Southern Conference men's basketball tournament =

American college basketball postseason tournament

- Classification: Division I
- Season: 2023–24
- Teams: 10
- Site: Harrah's Cherokee Center; Asheville, North Carolina
- Champions: Samford (1st title)
- Winning coach: Bucky McMillan (1st title)
- Attendance: 20,802 (total); 5,112 (championship)
- Television: ESPN+, Nexstar, ESPNU, ESPN2

2023–24 Southern Conference men's basketball standings
	Conf.				Overall
Team	W		L	PCT	W		L	PCT
Samford †	15	–	3	.833	29	–	6	.829
UNC Greensboro	12	–	6	.667	21	–	11	.656
Chattanooga	12	–	6	.667	21	–	12	.636
Western Carolina	11	–	7	.611	22	–	10	.688
Furman	10	–	8	.556	17	–	16	.515
Wofford	10	–	8	.556	17	–	15	.531
East Tennessee State	8	–	10	.444	19	–	16	.543
Mercer	8	–	10	.444	16	–	17	.485
The Citadel	3	–	15	.167	11	–	21	.344
VMI	1	–	17	.056	4	–	28	.125
† 2024 SoCon tournament winner

The 2024 Southern Conference Men's Basketball Tournament was the postseason men's basketball tournament for the Southern Conference for the 2023–24 season. All tournament games were played at the Harrah's Cherokee Center in Asheville, North Carolina, from March 8–11, 2024. The winner of the tournament, Samford, received the conference's automatic bid to the 2024 NCAA Division I Men's Basketball Tournament.

== Seeds ==
All ten teams in the Southern Conference will be eligible to compete in the conference tournament. Teams will be seeded by record within the conference, with a tiebreaker system to seed teams with identical conference records. The top six teams will receive first-round byes.

Seed	School	Conference	Tiebreaker 1	Tiebreaker 2	Tiebreaker 3	Tiebreaker 4
1	Samford	15–3				
2	UNC Greensboro	12–6	1–1 vs. Chattanooga	0–2 vs. Samford	2–0 vs. Western Carolina	
3	Chattanooga	12–6	1–1 vs. UNC Greensboro	0–2 vs. Samford	1–1 vs. Western Carolina	
4	Western Carolina	11–7				
5	Furman	10–8	1–1 vs. Wofford	1–1 vs. Samford	0–2 vs. UNC Greensboro	1–1 vs. Chattanooga
6	Wofford	10–8	1–1 vs. Furman	1–1 vs. Samford	0–2 vs. UNC Greensboro	0–2 vs. Chattanooga
7	East Tennessee State	8–10	2–0 vs. Mercer			
8	Mercer	8–10	0–2 vs. East Tennessee State			
9	The Citadel	3–15				
10	VMI	1–17				

== Schedule and results ==
Game	Time	Matchup	Score	Television	Attendance
First round – Friday, March 8
1	5:00 pm	No. 8 Mercer vs. No. 9 The Citadel	84–76	ESPN+	2,484
2	7:30 pm	No. 7 East Tennessee State vs. No. 10 VMI	98–66	ESPN+	2,484
Quarterfinals – Saturday, March 9
3	12:00 pm	No. 1 Samford vs. No. 8 Mercer	70–57	ESPN+/Nexstar	4,194
4	2:30 pm	No. 2 UNC Greensboro vs. No. 7 East Tennessee State	62–73	ESPN+/Nexstar	4,194
5	6:00 pm	No. 3 Chattanooga vs. No. 6 Wofford	75–57	ESPN+/Nexstar	5,020
6	8:30 pm	No. 4 Western Carolina vs. No. 5 Furman	76–79 ^{OT}	ESPN+/Nexstar	5,020
Semifinals – Sunday, March 10
7	4:00 pm	No. 1 Samford vs. No. 5 Furman	84–77	ESPNU	3,992
8	6:30 pm	No. 7 East Tennessee State vs No. 3 Chattanooga	85–84 ^{OT}	ESPNU	3,992
Final – Monday, March 11
9	7:00 pm	No. 1 Samford vs. No. 7 East Tennessee State	76–69	ESPN2	5,112
*Game times in EST. Rankings denote tournament seed

== Bracket ==
First round March 8 ESPN+
8	Mercer	84
9	The Citadel	76
7	East Tennessee State	98
10	VMI	66

Quarterfinals; March 9 ESPN+/Nexstar
1	Samford	70
8	Mercer	57
4	Western Carolina	76
5	Furman	79*
2	UNC Greensboro	62
7	East Tennessee State	73
3	Chattanooga	75
6	Wofford	57

Semifinals; March 10; ESPNU
1	Samford	84
5	Furman	77
7	East Tennessee State	85*
3	Chattanooga	84

Championship; March 11; ESPN2
1	Samford	76
7	East Tennessee State	69

== See also ==
- 2024 Southern Conference women's basketball tournament
