= Mitch Cole =

American basketball coach

Current position
- Title: Assistant coach
- Team: Texas A&M
- Conference: SEC

Biographical details
- Born: New Orleans, Louisiana

Playing career
- 1988–1992: Montana State Billings

Coaching career (HC unless noted)
- 1992–1994: Southeastern Louisiana (assistant)
- 1994–1995: Auburn (graduate assistant)
- 1995–2006: Birmingham–Southern (assistant)
- 2007–2011: Birmingham–Southern
- 2011–2016: Texas A&M (assistant)
- 2016–2018: Little Rock (assistant)
- 2018–2021: Berry
- 2021–2025: Samford (assistant)
- 2025–present: Texas A&M (assistant)

Head coaching record
- Overall: 118–52 (.694)

Accomplishments and honors

Awards
- D3hoops.com South Region Coach of the Year (2011); Southern Athletic Association Coach of the Year (2021)

Mitch Cole is an American men's basketball coach, currently an assistant coach at Texas A&M University. He previously coached at Birmingham–Southern, University of Arkansas at Little Rock, Berry College and Samford.

== Early life and education ==
Cole is a native of New Orleans, Louisiana. He played basketball at Holy Cross School, graduating in 1988. Cole subsequently attended Montana State Billings and played basketball on its Yellow Jackets team. In 1992, he graduated with degrees in history and education. Cole earned his master's degree in education from Auburn University in 1995.

== Coaching career ==
Cole began his coaching career as a volunteer assistant at Southeastern Louisiana in 1992. He also served as a graduate assistant at Auburn while he attended the university. In 1995, Cole was hired as an assistant coach at Birmingham–Southern under Duane Reboul. He helped the Panthers reach the NAIA National Tournament every year from 1996 to 2000. In 2000, the school began its transition to NCAA Division I, and Cole successfully recruited and developed players that made Birmingham–Southern competitive despite a five-year postseason ban. In the 2003–04 season, in Birmingham–Southern's first full season as a member of Division I, he helped the team finish 20–7 and win the Big South Conference Co-Championship.

After Reboul was informed that the school would move to NCAA Division III, he stepped down in protest in July 2006 and was replaced by Cole. Due to player defections, Birmingham–Southern did not field a basketball team in the 2006–07 season. Cole was responsible for building the program from the ground up and posted a 13–12 record with 15 freshmen in 2007–08. The Panthers went 20–5 two years later and won the Southern Collegiate Athletic Conference (SCAC) East Division title. In the 2010–11 season, Cole led Birmingham–Southern to one of its best seasons, winning the NCAA Division III Provisional Tournament championship and going 23–4 and 14–2 in the SCAC. He was named D3hoops.com South Region Coach of the Year. In June 2011, Cole announced he was leaving the school to accept an assistant coaching position at Texas A&M, finishing his tenure at Birmingham–Southern with a record of 67–35.

Under Billy Kennedy, Cole spent five seasons on the bench at Texas A&M. He helped the Aggies win a school-record 28 games in 2015–16, win the Southeastern Conference, and reach the Sweet 16 of the NCAA Division I tournament after a last-minute win over Northern Iowa. In May 2016, Cole joined the staff of Wes Flanigan at Little Rock. He coached the Trojans for two seasons. In April 2018, Cole was announced as the head coach at Berry College. In his first season at Berry, Cole led the Vikings to a 19–7 overall record, the most overall wins in their NCAA DIII era, and 11–3 in the Southern Athletic Association (SAA). He won his 100th game in January 2020 over his former team, Birmingham–Southern. During the 2020–21 season, Cole led the Vikings to the Southern Athletic Association regular season and tournament championship and earned 2021 SAA Coach of the Year honors. He finished with a 51–17 record at Berry.

In July 2021, Cole was hired as an assistant coach at Samford under Bucky McMillan. On April 5, 2025, it was announced that Cole would return to Texas A&M University as an assistant to follow McMillan.

== Personal life ==
Cole is married to Amy and has three children: daughter Laura Kate and sons Carson and Joshua.
