= 2023–24 Mercer Bears men's basketball team =

American college basketball season

2023–24 Mercer Bears men's basketball
- Conference: Southern Conference
- Record: 16–17 (8–10 SoCon)
- Head coach: Greg Gary (5th season)
- Assistant coaches: Bobby Kummer; Kim Lewis; D.J. Byrd
- Home arena: Hawkins Arena

2023–24 Southern Conference men's basketball standings
	Conf.				Overall
Team	W		L	PCT	W		L	PCT
Samford †	15	–	3	.833	29	–	6	.829
UNC Greensboro	12	–	6	.667	21	–	11	.656
Chattanooga	12	–	6	.667	21	–	12	.636
Western Carolina	11	–	7	.611	22	–	10	.688
Furman	10	–	8	.556	17	–	16	.515
Wofford	10	–	8	.556	17	–	15	.531
East Tennessee State	8	–	10	.444	19	–	16	.543
Mercer	8	–	10	.444	16	–	17	.485
The Citadel	3	–	15	.167	11	–	21	.344
VMI	1	–	17	.056	4	–	28	.125
† 2024 SoCon tournament winner

The 2023–24 Mercer Bears men's basketball team represented Mercer University in the 2023–24 NCAA Division I men's basketball season. The Bears, led by fifth-year head coach Greg Gary, played their home games at Hawkins Arena in Macon, Georgia as a member of the Southern Conference (SoCon). The Bears finished the season 16–17, 8–10 in SoCon play, to finish in eighth place. They defeated The Citadel in the first round of the SoCon tournament, before losing to Samford in the quarterfinals. Following the conclusion of the season, head coach Greg Gary and the school parted ways.

== Previous season ==
The Bears finished the 2022–23 season 14–19, 6–12 in SoCon play, to finish in eighth place. They defeated The Citadel in the first round of the SoCon tournament, before losing to Furman in the quarterfinals.

== Roster ==
2023–24 Mercer Bears men's basketball team
Players
Coaches

Pos.	#	Name	Height	Weight	Year	Hometown
G	0	Jah Quinones	6 ft 4 in (1.93 m)	225 lb (102 kg)	So	Orlando, FL
G	1	Anthony Benard	5 ft 10 in (1.78 m)	170 lb (77 kg)	Fr	Detroit, MI
G	2	Michael Zanoni	6 ft 5 in (1.96 m)	195 lb (88 kg)	So	Charlotte, NC
G	3	Jalen Cobb	6 ft 1 in (1.85 m)	170 lb (77 kg)	GS	Decatur, GA
F	5	Jalyn McCreary	6 ft 8 in (2.03 m)	225 lb (102 kg)	RS Sr	Marietta, GA
F	6	Alex Holt	6 ft 8 in (2.03 m)	220 lb (100 kg)	Jr	Lexington, NC
F	8	Amanze Ngumezi	6 ft 9 in (2.06 m)	245 lb (111 kg)	GS	Savannah, GA
F	9	Earnest Ofremu	6 ft 5 in (1.96 m)	180 lb (82 kg)	Fr	Powder Springs, GA
G	10	Caleb Hunter	5 ft 10 in (1.78 m)	180 lb (82 kg)	Jr	Detroit, MI
G	11	Robby Carmody	6 ft 4 in (1.93 m)	195 lb (88 kg)	GS	Mars, PA
G	12	David Thomas	6 ft 2 in (1.88 m)	195 lb (88 kg)	Fr	McDonough, GA
F	14	TJ Grant	6 ft 5 in (1.96 m)	210 lb (95 kg)	So	Warner Robins, GA
F	15	Jake Davis	6 ft 6 in (1.98 m)	210 lb (95 kg)	Fr	McCordsville, IN
G	22	Lukas Platauna	6 ft 4 in (1.93 m)	190 lb (86 kg)	Fr	Savannah, GA
C	23	Sidy Diallo	7 ft 2 in (2.18 m)	210 lb (95 kg)	So	Dakar, Senegal

Head coach

- Greg Gary (Tulane)

Assistant coach(es)

- Bobby Kummer (Charlotte)
- Kim Lewis (Tulane)
- D.J. Byrd (Purdue)

Legend

- (C) Team captain
- (S) Suspended
- (I) Ineligible
- (W) Walk-on
- Injured
- Current redshirt

Roster
Last update: November 25, 2023

== Schedule and results ==
Date time, TV	Rank^{#}	Opponent^{#}	Result	Record	Site (attendance) city, state
Non-conference regular season
November 6, 2023*; 7:00 p.m., ESPN+		Clark Atlanta	L 64–71	0–1	Hawkins Arena (1,272); Macon, GA
November 9, 2023*; 8:00 p.m.		at Chicago State	W 66–61	1–1	Jones Convocation Center (233); Chicago, IL
November 14, 2023*; 7:00 p.m., ESPN+		at Morehead State	L 66–74	1–2	Ellis Johnson Arena (1,455); Morehead, KY
November 17, 2023*; 8:00 p.m., SECN+/ESPN+		at No. 22 Alabama; Emerald Coast Classic campus-site game	L 67–98	1–3	Coleman Coliseum (10,300); Tuscaloosa, AL
November 24, 2023*; 12:00 p.m.		vs. Tennessee State; Emerald Coast Classic semifinals	W 60–59	2–3	The Arena at NFSC (100); Niceville, FL
November 25, 2023*; 1:30 p.m.		vs. Western Michigan; Emerald Coast Classic championship	L 66–72	2–4	The Arena at NFSC (150); Niceville, FL
December 1, 2023*; 7:00 p.m., SECN+/ESPN+		at Georgia	L 69–80	2–5	Stegeman Coliseum (5,694); Athens, GA
December 6, 2023*; 11:00 a.m., ESPN+		South Alabama	L 62–83	2–6	Hawkins Arena (3,207); Macon, GA
December 9, 2023*; 2:00 p.m., ESPN+		Georgia State	W 64–60	3–6	Hawkins Arena (1,527); Macon, GA
December 16, 2023*; 2:00 p.m., ESPN+		Florida Gulf Coast	W 70–65	4–6	Hawkins Arena (1,009); Macon, GA
December 19, 2023*; 7:00 p.m., ESPN+		Queens	W 84–65	5–6	Hawkins Arena (839); Macon, GA
December 21, 2023*; 1:00 p.m., ESPN+		Thomas	W 98–75	6–6	Hawkins Arena (437); Macon, GA
December 29, 2023*; 2:00 p.m., ESPN+		Talladega	W 74–50	7–6	Hawkins Arena (1,257); Macon, GA
SoCon regular season
January 3, 2024; 7:00 p.m., ESPN+		at East Tennessee State	L 69–80	7–7 (0–1)	Freedom Hall Civic Center (3,529); Johnson City, TN
January 6, 2024; 1:00 p.m., ESPN+		at VMI	W 86–64	8–7 (1–1)	Cameron Hall (322); Lexington, VA
January 10, 2024; 7:00 p.m., ESPN+		Wofford	L 73–74	8–8 (1–2)	Jerry Richardson Indoor Stadium (1,150); Spartanburg, SC
January 13, 2024; 2:00 p.m., ESPN+		Western Carolina	L 52–64	8–9 (1–3)	Hawkins Arena (3,227); Macon, GA
January 17, 2024; 7:00 p.m., ESPN+		Chattanooga	L 60–74	8–10 (1–4)	Hawkins Arena (1,872); Macon, GA
January 20, 2024; 12:00 p.m., ESPN+		at Samford	L 80–87	8–11 (1–5)	Pete Hanna Center (2,516); Homewood, AL
January 24, 2024; 7:00 p.m., ESPN+		at The Citadel	L 66–68	8–12 (1–6)	McAlister Field House (1,283); Charleston, SC
January 27, 2024; 7:00 p.m., ESPN+		at UNC Greensboro	W 70–64	9–12 (2–6)	Greensboro Coliseum (1,686); Greensboro, NC
January 31, 2024; 7:00 p.m., ESPN+		East Tennessee State	L 49–54	9–13 (2–7)	Hawkins Arena (2,163); Macon, GA
February 3, 2024; 2:00 p.m., ESPN+		VMI	W 90–69	10–13 (3–7)	Hawkins Arena (2,438); Macon, GA
February 7, 2024; 7:00 p.m., ESPN+		Furman	W 78–69	11–13 (4–7)	Hawkins Arena (1,989); Macon, GA
February 10, 2024; 4:00 p.m., ESPN+		at West Carolina	L 46–79	11–14 (4–8)	Ramsey Center (2,588); Cullowhee, NC
February 14, 2023; 7:00 p.m., ESPN+		at Wofford	L 60–73	11–15 (4–9)	Jerry Richardson Indoor Stadium (1,762); Spartanburg, SC
February 17, 2024; 2:00 p.m., ESPN+		Samford	W 88–84	12–15 (5–9)	Hawkins Arena (2,901); Macon, GA
February 21, 2024; 7:00 p.m., ESPN+		The Citadel	W 87–78	13–15 (6–9)	Hawkins Arena (1,514); Macon, GA
February 24, 2024; 4:30 p.m., ESPN+		UNC Greensboro	W 86–72	14–15 (7–9)	Hawkins Arena (2,772); Macon, GA
February 28, 2024; 7:00 p.m., ESPN+		at Chattanooga	L 75–84	14–16 (7–10)	McKenzie Arena (3,054); Chattanooga, TN
March 2, 2024; 5:00 p.m., ESPN+		at Furman	W 82–75	15–16 (8–10)	Timmons Arena (2,457); Greenville, SC
SoCon tournament
March 8, 2024; 5:00 p.m., ESPN+	(8)	vs. (9) The Citadel; First round	W 84–76	16–16	Harrah's Cherokee Center; Asheville, NC
March 9, 2024; 12:00 p.m., ESPN+	(8)	vs. (1) Samford; Quarterfinals	L 57–70	16–17	Harrah's Cherokee Center; Asheville, NC
*Non-conference game. ^{#}Rankings from AP poll. (#) Tournament seedings in parentheses. All times are in Eastern.
