= 2023–24 Wofford Terriers men's basketball team =

American college basketball season

2023–24 Wofford Terriers men's basketball
- Conference: Southern Conference
- Record: 17–15 (10–8 SoCon)
- Head coach: Dwight Perry (1st season)
- Associate head coach: Will Murphy
- Assistant coaches: Tysor Anderson; Drew Gibson
- Home arena: Jerry Richardson Indoor Stadium

2023–24 Southern Conference men's basketball standings
	Conf.				Overall
Team	W		L	PCT	W		L	PCT
Samford †	15	–	3	.833	29	–	6	.829
UNC Greensboro	12	–	6	.667	21	–	11	.656
Chattanooga	12	–	6	.667	21	–	12	.636
Western Carolina	11	–	7	.611	22	–	10	.688
Furman	10	–	8	.556	17	–	16	.515
Wofford	10	–	8	.556	17	–	15	.531
East Tennessee State	8	–	10	.444	19	–	16	.543
Mercer	8	–	10	.444	16	–	17	.485
The Citadel	3	–	15	.167	11	–	21	.344
VMI	1	–	17	.056	4	–	28	.125
† 2024 SoCon tournament winner

The 2023–24 Wofford Terriers men's basketball team represented Wofford College during the 2023–24 NCAA Division I men's basketball season. The Terriers, led by first-year head coach Dwight Perry, played their home games at Jerry Richardson Indoor Stadium in Spartanburg, South Carolina as a member of the Southern Conference.

== Previous season ==
The Terriers finished the 2022–23 season 17–16, 8–10 in SoCon play to finish in a tie for fifth place. As the #6 seed, they upset #3 seed UNC Greensboro in the quarterfinals of the SoCon tournament, before falling to #7 seed Chattanooga in the semifinals.

On December 30, 2022, head coach Jay McAuley resigned after four years at the helm, after being on a leave of absence since December 5, with assistant coach Dwight Perry serving as the interim head coach for the remainder of the season. On March 21, 2023, the school removed the interim tag and made Perry the permanent head coach.

== Roster ==
2023–24 Wofford Terriers men's basketball team
Players
Coaches

Pos.	#	Name	Height	Weight	Year	Hometown
G	0	Jackson Sivills	6 ft 6 in (1.98 m)	207 lb (94 kg)	Jr	Paducah, Kentucky
G	1	Chase Cormier	6 ft 2 in (1.88 m)	173 lb (78 kg)	So	Atlanta, Georgia
G	2	Dillon Bailey	6 ft 3 in (1.91 m)	185 lb (84 kg)	Jr	Bentonville, Arkansas
G	5	Chase Martin	6 ft 5 in (1.96 m)	205 lb (93 kg)	So	Jenks, Oklahoma
G	10	Corey Tripp	6 ft 3 in (1.91 m)	195 lb (88 kg)	Jr	Medina, Ohio
G	11	Quentin Meza	6 ft 0 in (1.83 m)	173 lb (78 kg)	Fr	West Valley City, Utah
G	12	Tauris Watson	6 ft 3 in (1.91 m)	190 lb (86 kg)	Jr	Lexington, South Carolina
C	14	Kyler Filewich	6 ft 9 in (2.06 m)	250 lb (113 kg)	Jr	Winnipeg, Manitoba
G	21	Joe Spinelli	6 ft 0 in (1.83 m)	170 lb (77 kg)	So	Watertown, Massachusetts
F	24	Belal El Shakery	6 ft 8 in (2.03 m)	230 lb (104 kg)	Fr	Alexandria, Egypt
G	30	Anthony Arrington Jr.	6 ft 2 in (1.88 m)	190 lb (86 kg)	So	Atlanta, Georgia
F	32	Jeremy Lorenz	6 ft 8 in (2.03 m)	220 lb (100 kg)	Fr	Brillion, Wisconsin
F	34	Don Douglass	6 ft 10 in (2.08 m)	215 lb (98 kg)	Fr	Spartanburg, South Carolina

Head coach

- Dwight Perry (Kentucky)

Assistant coach(es)

- Will Murphy (Wake Forest)
- Tysor Anderson (Georgia Tech)
- Drew Gibson (Wofford)

Legend

- (C) Team captain
- (S) Suspended
- (I) Ineligible
- (W) Walk-on
- Injured
- Current redshirt

Roster
Last update: November 2, 2023

== Schedule and results ==
Date time, TV	Rank^{#}	Opponent^{#}	Result	Record	High points	High rebounds	High assists	Site (attendance) city, state
Exhibition
November 1, 2023*; 7:00 pm		at South Carolina	L 57–60	–	10 – Tied	9 – Filewich	4 – Tripp	Colonial Life Arena; Columbia, SC
Non-conference regular season
November 6, 2023*; 7:00 pm, ESPN+		Brevard	W 85–68	1–0	19 – Tripp	10 – Lorenz	6 – Tripp	Jerry Richardson Indoor Stadium (1,039); Spartanburg, SC
November 11, 2023*; 12:00 pm, ESPN+		High Point	W 99–98	2–0	20 – Bailey	6 – Tied	4 – Martin	Jerry Richardson Indoor Stadium (878); Spartanburg, SC
November 14, 2023*; 6:30 pm, ESPN+/SECN+		at No. 7 Tennessee	L 61–82	2–1	19 – Tripp	8 – Filewich	5 – Tripp	Thompson–Boling Arena (16,859); Knoxville, TN
November 19, 2023*; 5:00 pm, ESPN+/ACCNX		at Virginia Tech	L 76–98	2–2	14 – Tripp	10 – Filewich	3 – Sivills	Cassell Coliseum (4,582); Blacksburg, VA
November 24, 2023*; 4:30 pm		vs. Canisius; Northern Classic	L 67–76	2–3	20 – Bailey	8 – Filewich	2 – Tied	Place Bell; Laval, QC
November 25, 2023*; 4:30 pm		vs. UNC Asheville; Northern Classic	L 82–85 ^{OT}	2–4	21 – Tripp	13 – Lorenz	4 – Tripp	Place Bell (100); Laval, QC
November 26, 2023*; 1:30 pm		vs. Lipscomb; Northern Classic	L 78–85	2–5	20 – Tripp	9 – Tripp	5 – Filewich	Place Bell; Laval, QC
December 2, 2023*; 6:30 pm		at Middle Tennessee	W 74–64	3–5	18 – Bailey	10 – Tied	7 – Tripp	Murphy Center (2,510); Murfreesboro, TN
December 6, 2023*; 7:00 pm, ESPN+		at Gardner–Webb	W 81–66	4–5	20 – Bailey	10 – Filewich	4 – Tied	Paul Porter Arena (250); Boiling Springs, NC
December 9, 2023*; 2:00 pm, ESPN+		at Coastal Carolina	W 88–80	5–5	22 – Lorenz	11 – Filewich	7 – Tripp	HTC Center (1,239); Conway, SC
December 17, 2023*; 2:00 pm, ESPN+		Kentucky Christian	W 105–54	6–5	19 – Sivills	9 – Lorenz	5 – Meza	Jerry Richardson Indoor Stadium (871); Spartanburg, SC
December 20, 2023*; 3:00 pm, ESPN+		at Oklahoma State	L 70–76	6–6	24 – Tripp	11 – Filewich	4 – Bailey	Gallagher-Iba Arena (5,637); Stillwater, OK
December 29, 2023*; 2:00 pm, ESPN+		Southern Wesleyan	W 75–55	7–6	15 – Sivills	21 – Filewich	3 – Tied	Jerry Richardson Indoor Stadium (843); Spartanburg, SC
SoCon regular season
January 3, 2024; 7:00 pm, ESPN+		VMI	W 87–85 ^{OT}	8–6 (1–0)	28 – Tripp	17 – Filewich	4 – Filewich	Jerry Richardson Indoor Stadium (1,016); Spartanburg, SC
January 6, 2024; 4:00 pm, ESPN+		at Western Carolina	L 66–70	8–7 (1–1)	17 – Tripp	10 – Filewich	4 – Tripp	Ramsey Center (2,008); Cullowhee, NC
January 10, 2024; 7:00 pm, ESPN+		Mercer	W 74–73	9–7 (2–1)	19 – Tripp	9 – Filewich	4 – Filewich	Jerry Richardson Indoor Stadium (1,150); Spartanburg, SC
January 13, 2024; 1:00 pm, ESPN+		at The Citadel	W 72–71	10–7 (3–1)	18 – Bailey	6 – Tripp	6 – Tied	McAlister Field House (2,267); Charleston, SC
January 17, 2024; 7:00 pm, ESPN+		East Tennessee State	W 75–73	11–7 (4–1)	13 – Bailey	12 – Filewich	5 – Filewich	Jerry Richardson Indoor Stadium (1,182); Spartanburg, SC
January 20, 2024; 4:00 pm, ESPN+		at UNC Greensboro	L 59–82	11–8 (4–2)	19 – Tripp	7 – El Shakery	2 – Tied	Greensboro Coliseum (1,906); Greensboro, NC
January 24, 2024; 7:00 pm, ESPN+		Chattanooga	L 65–79	11–9 (4–3)	22 – Tripp	4 – Filewich	3 – Tied	Jerry Richardson Indoor Stadium (1,146); Spartanburg, SC
January 27, 2024; 7:00 pm, ESPN+		Furman	W 77–67	12–9 (5–3)	20 – Tripp	10 – Filewich	5 – Tripp	Jerry Richardson Indoor Stadium (3,500); Spartanburg, SC
January 31, 2024; 7:30 pm, ESPN+		at Samford	L 79–81	12–10 (5–4)	14 – Bailey	10 – Filewich	6 – Filewich	Pete Hanna Center (2,431); Homewood, AL
February 3, 2024; 4:00 pm, ESPN+		Western Carolina	W 88–86 ^{OT}	13–10 (6–4)	27 – Tripp	12 – Filewich	4 – Tripp	Jerry Richardson Indoor Stadium (2,051); Spartanburg, SC
February 7, 2024; 7:00 pm, ESPN+		at East Tennessee State	L 50–57	13–11 (6–5)	13 – Tripp	5 – Sivillis	3 – Tied	Freedom Hall Civic Center (3,421); Johnson City, TN
February 10, 2024; 7:00 pm, ESPN+		The Citadel	W 77–64	14–11 (7–5)	15 – Tied	6 – Filewich	5 – Filewich	Jerry Richardson Indoor Stadium (2,236); Spartanburg, SC
February 14, 2024; 7:00 pm, ESPN+		at Mercer	W 73–60	15–11 (8–5)	17 – Bailey	9 – Filewich	4 – Tied	Hawkins Arena (1,762); Macon, GA
February 17, 2024; 7:00 pm, ESPN+		UNC Greensboro	L 47–58	15–12 (8–6)	13 – Tripp	11 – Filewich	5 – Filewich	Jerry Richardson Indoor Stadium (2,074); Spartanburg, SC
February 21, 2024; 7:00 pm, ESPN+		at Chattanooga	L 65–81	15–13 (8–7)	21 – Tripp	6 – Filewich	5 – Filewich	McKenzie Arena (3,019); Chattanooga, TN
February 24, 2024; 4:00 pm, ESPN+		at Furman	L 67–82	15–14 (8–8)	11 – Tied	11 – Filewich	5 – Tripp	Timmons Arena (2,547); Greenville, SC
February 28, 2024; 7:00 pm, ESPN+		Samford	W 91–69	16–14 (9–8)	20 – Bailey	8 – Filewich	4 – Tripp	Jerry Richardson Indoor Stadium (1,674); Spartanburg, SC
March 2, 2024; 1:00 pm, ESPN+		at VMI	W 74–62	17–14 (10–8)	17 – Tripp	10 – Sivills	6 – Filewich	Cameron Hall (3,167); Lexington, VA
SoCon tournament
March 9, 2024; 6:00 pm, ESPN+/Nexstar	(6)	vs. (3) Chattanooga; Quarterfinals	L 57–75	17–15	15 – Tripp	8 – Filewich	4 – Filewich	Harrah's Cherokee Center; Asheville, NC
*Non-conference game. ^{#}Rankings from AP Poll. (#) Tournament seedings in parentheses. All times are in Eastern.
