= 2023–24 VMI Keydets basketball team =

American college basketball season

2023–24 VMI Keydets basketball
- Conference: Southern Conference
- Record: 4–28 (1–17 SoCon)
- Head coach: Andrew Wilson (2nd season)
- Associate head coach: Dave Davis
- Assistant coaches: Keith Chesley; Austin Kenon; Luke Colwell
- Home arena: Cameron Hall

2023–24 Southern Conference men's basketball standings
	Conf.				Overall
Team	W		L	PCT	W		L	PCT
Samford †	15	–	3	.833	29	–	6	.829
UNC Greensboro	12	–	6	.667	21	–	11	.656
Chattanooga	12	–	6	.667	21	–	12	.636
Western Carolina	11	–	7	.611	22	–	10	.688
Furman	10	–	8	.556	17	–	16	.515
Wofford	10	–	8	.556	17	–	15	.531
East Tennessee State	8	–	10	.444	19	–	16	.543
Mercer	8	–	10	.444	16	–	17	.485
The Citadel	3	–	15	.167	11	–	21	.344
VMI	1	–	17	.056	4	–	28	.125
† 2024 SoCon tournament winner

The 2023–24 VMI Keydets basketball team represented the Virginia Military Institute during the 2023–24 NCAA Division I men's basketball season. The Keydets, led by second-year head coach Andrew Wilson, played their home games at Cameron Hall in Lexington, Virginia, as members of the Southern Conference (SoCon).

== Previous season ==
The Keydets finished the 2022–23 season 7–25, 2–16 in SoCon play, to finish in last place. In the first round of the SoCon tournament, they were defeated by Chattanooga.

== Roster ==
2023–24 VMI Keydets men's basketball team
Players
Coaches

Pos.	#	Name	Height	Weight	Year	Hometown
G	0	Tyran Cook	6 ft 2 in (1.88 m)	185 lb (84 kg)	Fr	Milwaukee, WI
G	1	Brennan Watkins	5 ft 11 in (1.8 m)	162 lb (73 kg)	Jr	Kearney, MO
G	2	Taeshaud II Jackson	6 ft 6 in (1.98 m)	210 lb (95 kg)	So	Denver, CO
G	3	Jaren Morton	6 ft 5 in (1.96 m)	185 lb (84 kg)	Fr	Burlington, NJ
G	4	Koree Cotton	6 ft 6 in (1.98 m)	185 lb (84 kg)	Fr	Florida City, FL
G	5	AJ Clark	6 ft 4 in (1.93 m)	180 lb (82 kg)	Fr	Suffolk, VA
F	10	Stephen Olowoniyi	6 ft 8 in (2.03 m)	195 lb (88 kg)	Fr	Melbourne, Australia
G	11	Devin Butler	6 ft 2 in (1.88 m)	195 lb (88 kg)	Sr	Ridgeland, SC
G	12	Corey Chesley	6 ft 5 in (1.96 m)	195 lb (88 kg)	Fr	White Plains, MD
G	14	Walker Andrews	6 ft 1 in (1.85 m)	170 lb (77 kg)	Fr	Fincastle, VA
G	15	Cooper Sisco	6 ft 5 in (1.96 m)	185 lb (84 kg)	Jr	Frisco, TX
G	20	Jake Johnston	5 ft 9 in (1.75 m)	155 lb (70 kg)	Sr	Bristol, VA
G	23	Maurice Jr. Wright	6 ft 2 in (1.88 m)	165 lb (75 kg)	Fr	Palmdale, CA
F	32	Robert Peters	6 ft 8 in (2.03 m)	205 lb (93 kg)	Fr	West Allis, WI
C	42	DJ Nussbaum	6 ft 9 in (2.06 m)	230 lb (104 kg)	Sr	Houston, TX
G		Jacob Adair	6 ft 2 in (1.88 m)	165 lb (75 kg)	Fr	Asheville, NC
G		Timayahs Bracey	5 ft 10 in (1.78 m)	180 lb (82 kg)	Fr	Richmond, VA

Head coach

- Andrew Wilson (Florida State)

Assistant coach(es)

- Dave Davis (Warren Wilson)
- Keith Chesley (Maine–Augusta)
- Austin Kenon (VMI)
- Luke Colwell (South Carolina)

Legend

- (C) Team captain
- (S) Suspended
- (I) Ineligible
- (W) Walk-on
- Injured
- Current redshirt

Roster
Last update: October 23, 2023

== Schedule and results ==
Date time, TV	Rank^{#}	Opponent^{#}	Result	Record	Site (attendance) city, state
Non-conference regular season
November 6, 2023*; 7:00 p.m.		at Richmond	L 75–93	0–1	Robins Center (5,167); Richmond, VA
November 9, 2023*; 7:00 p.m., ESPN+		Christendom	W 87–53	1–1	Cameron Hall (247); Lexington, VA
November 13, 2023*; 7:00 p.m., ESPN+/SECN+		at South Carolina; Arizona Tip-Off campus game	L 64–74	1–2	Colonial Life Arena (10,449); Columbia, SC
November 17, 2023*; 2:00 p.m.		vs. South Dakota; Arizona Tip-Off Desert Division	L 81–85	1–3	Desert Diamond Arena (1,028); Glendale, AZ
November 18, 2023*; 2:00 p.m.		vs. Northern Arizona; Arizona Tip-Off Desert Division	L 69–78	1–4	Desert Diamond Arena (1,211); Glendale, AZ
November 22, 2023*; 5:00 p.m.		at Air Force	L 54–64	1–5	Clune Arena (1,048); Colorado Springs, CO
November 25, 2023*; 1:00 p.m., ESPN+		Clarks Summit	W 100–63	2–5	Cameron Hall (212); Lexington, VA
November 29, 2023*; 7:00 p.m., ESPN+		at Navy	L 47–67	2–6	Alumni Hall (657); Annapolis, MD
December 2, 2023*; 1:00 p.m., ESPN+		Presbyterian	L 71–75	2–7	Cameron Hall (3,310); Lexington, VA
December 9, 2023*; 1:00 p.m., ESPN+		American	L 69–77	2–8	Cameron Hall (3,317); Lexington, VA
December 12, 2023*; 7:00 p.m., ESPN+		at Radford	L 56–73	2–9	Dedmon Center (1,413); Radford, VA
December 17, 2023*; 2:00 p.m., ESPN+		at Longwood	L 49–68	2–10	Joan Perry Brock Center (2,337); Farmville, VA
December 22, 2023*; 12:00 p.m., ESPN+		Penn State New Kensington	W 82–65	3–10	Cameron Hall (374); Lexington, VA
SoCon regular season
January 3, 2024; 7:00 p.m., ESPN+		at Wofford	L 85–87 ^{OT}	3–11 (0–1)	Jerry Richardson Indoor Stadium (1,016); Spartanburg, SC
January 6, 2024; 1:00 p.m., ESPN+		Mercer	L 64–86	3–12 (0–2)	Cameron Hall (322); Lexington, VA
January 11, 2024; 7:00 p.m., ESPN+		at Chattanooga	L 61–109	3–13 (0–3)	McKenzie Arena (3,241); Chattanooga, TN
January 13, 2024; 12:00 p.m., ESPN+		at Samford	L 96–134	3–14 (0–4)	Pete Hanna Center (3,714); Homewood, AL
January 17, 2024; 7:00 p.m., ESPN+		Furman	L 60–100	3–15 (0–5)	Cameron Hall (329); Lexington, VA
January 20, 2024; 1:00 p.m., ESPN+		The Citadel	W 70–63	4–15 (1–5)	Cameron Hall (4,417); Lexington, VA
January 24, 2024; 7:00 p.m., ESPN+		East Tennessee State	L 73–74	4–16 (1–6)	Cameron Hall (882); Lexington, VA
January 27, 2024; 5:00 p.m., ESPN+		at Western Carolina	L 77–102	4–17 (1–7)	Ramsey Center (3,860); Cullowhee, NC
January 31, 2024; 7:00 p.m., ESPN+		UNC Greensboro	L 79–85	4–18 (1–8)	Cameron Hall (1,126); Lexington, VA
February 3, 2024; 2:00 p.m., ESPN+		at Mercer	L 69–90	4–19 (1–9)	Hawkins Arena (2,438); Macon, GA
February 8, 2024; 7:00 p.m., ESPN+		Chattanooga	L 84–88	4–20 (1–10)	Cameron Hall (2,365); Lexington, VA
February 10, 2024; 1:00 p.m., ESPN+		Samford	L 63–102	4–21 (1–11)	Cameron Hall (3,267); Lexington, VA
February 14, 2024; 7:00 p.m., ESPN+		at Furman	L 62–75	4–22 (1–12)	Timmons Arena (1,947); Greenville, SC
February 17, 2024; 1:00 p.m., ESPN+		at The Citadel	L 51–76	4–23 (1–13)	McAlister Field House (2,337); Charleston, SC
February 21, 2024; 7:00 p.m., ESPN+		at East Tennessee State	L 69–82	4–24 (1–14)	Freedom Hall Civic Center (3,325); Johnson City, TN
February 24, 2024; 1:00 p.m., ESPN+		Western Carolina	L 51–84	4–25 (1–15)	Cameron Hall (3,287); Lexington, VA
February 28, 2024; 7:00 p.m., ESPN+		at UNC Greensboro	L 58–100	4–26 (1–16)	Greensboro Coliseum (1,210); Greensboro, NC
March 2, 2024; 1:00 p.m., ESPN+		Wofford	L 62–74	4–27 (1–17)	Cameron Hall (3,167); Lexington, VA
SoCon tournament
March 8, 2024; 7:30 p.m., ESPN+	(10)	vs. (7) East Tennessee State; First round	L 66–98	4–28	Harrah's Cherokee Center (2,484); Asheville, NC
*Non-conference game. ^{#}Rankings from AP poll. (#) Tournament seedings in parentheses. All times are in Eastern.
