= 2023–24 Chattanooga Mocs men's basketball team =

American college basketball season

2023–24 Chattanooga Mocs men's basketball
- Conference: Southern Conference
- Record: 21–12 (12–6 SoCon)
- Head coach: Dan Earl (2nd season)
- Assistant coaches: Ander Galfsky; Scott Greenman; Ricardo Rush Jr.
- Home arena: McKenzie Arena

2023–24 Southern Conference men's basketball standings
	Conf.				Overall
Team	W		L	PCT	W		L	PCT
Samford †	15	–	3	.833	29	–	6	.829
UNC Greensboro	12	–	6	.667	21	–	11	.656
Chattanooga	12	–	6	.667	21	–	12	.636
Western Carolina	11	–	7	.611	22	–	10	.688
Furman	10	–	8	.556	17	–	16	.515
Wofford	10	–	8	.556	17	–	15	.531
East Tennessee State	8	–	10	.444	19	–	16	.543
Mercer	8	–	10	.444	16	–	17	.485
The Citadel	3	–	15	.167	11	–	21	.344
VMI	1	–	17	.056	4	–	28	.125
† 2024 SoCon tournament winner

The 2023–24 Chattanooga Mocs men's basketball team represented the University of Tennessee at Chattanooga during the 2023–24 NCAA Division I men's basketball season. The Mocs, led by second-year head coach Dan Earl, played their home games at McKenzie Arena in Chattanooga, Tennessee, as members of the Southern Conference.

== Previous season ==
The Mocs finished the 2022–23 season 18–17, 7–11 in SoCon play to finish in seventh place. In the SoCon tournament, they defeated VMI, upset Samford and Wofford to advance to the championship game, where they would fall to top-seeded Furman.

== Roster ==
2023–24 Chattanooga Mocs men's basketball team
Players
Coaches

Pos.	#	Name	Height	Weight	Year	Hometown
G	0	Noah Melson	6 ft 6 in (1.98 m)	175 lb (79 kg)	Fr	Douglasville, Georgia
G	1	Ryan Lopez	5 ft 8 in (1.73 m)	175 lb (79 kg)	Fr	Ooltewah, Tennessee
G	2	Trey Bonham	6 ft 0 in (1.83 m)	175 lb (79 kg)	Sr	Mobile, Alabama
G	3	Honor Huff	5 ft 10 in (1.78 m)	162 lb (73 kg)	So	Brooklyn, New York
F	4	Sam Alexis	6 ft 9 in (2.06 m)	230 lb (104 kg)	So	Apopka, Florida
G/F	5	Sean Cusano	6 ft 9 in (2.06 m)	215 lb (98 kg)	Fr	Hilton Head, South Carolina
F	10	Tyler Millin	6 ft 7 in (2.01 m)	210 lb (95 kg)	Sr	Calera, Alabama
G	11	Rudy Fitzgibbons III	6 ft 0 in (1.83 m)	156 lb (71 kg)	Jr	Atlanta, Georgia
F	21	Collin Mulholland	6 ft 10 in (2.08 m)	218 lb (99 kg)	Fr	Kitchener, Ontario
G/F	22	Demetrius Davis	6 ft 9 in (2.06 m)	195 lb (88 kg)	Sr	Atlanta, Georgia
G	24	TJ Kolbe	6 ft 2 in (1.88 m)	175 lb (79 kg)	Fr	Hendersonville, Tennessee
F	25	Jan Zidek	6 ft 9 in (2.06 m)	240 lb (109 kg)	GS	Prague, Czech Republic
G/F	34	Randy Brady	6 ft 5 in (1.96 m)	215 lb (98 kg)	RS So	Chattanooga, Tennessee
G	77	Myles Che	6 ft 2 in (1.88 m)	190 lb (86 kg)	Fr	Los Angeles, California

Head coach

- Dan Earl (Penn State)

Assistant coach(es)

- Ander Galfsky (Birmingham–Southern)
- Scott Greenman (Princeton)
- Ricardo Rush Jr. (Maryland)

Legend

- (C) Team captain
- (S) Suspended
- (I) Ineligible
- (W) Walk-on
- Injured
- Current redshirt

Roster
Last update: October 31, 2023

== Schedule and results ==
Date time, TV	Rank^{#}	Opponent^{#}	Result	Record	Site (attendance) city, state
Non-conference regular season
November 6, 2023*; 7:00 pm, ESPN+		Covenant	W 89–44	1–0	McKenzie Arena (2,946); Chattanooga, TN
November 10, 2023*; 7:00 pm, ESPN+/ACCNX		at Louisville	W 81–71	2–0	KFC Yum! Center (10,634); Louisville, KY
November 14, 2023*; 7:00 pm, ESPN+		Bellarmine	W 72–64	3–0	McKenzie Arena (2,846); Chattanooga, TN
November 19, 2023*; 2:00 pm, ESPN+		Tennessee Tech	W 68–63	4–0	McKenzie Arena (3,023); Chattanooga, TN
November 24, 2023*; 2:00 pm, ESPN+		Evansville; Coke Zero Sugar Classic	L 77–85 ^{OT}	4–1	McKenzie Arena (3,148); Chattanooga, TN
November 26, 2023*; 2:00 pm, ESPN+		Southeast Missouri State; Coke Zero Sugar Classic	W 72–56	5–1	McKenzie Arena (2,907); Chattanooga, TN
November 29, 2023*; 12:00 pm, ESPN+		at Lipscomb	L 68–82	5–2	Allen Arena (2,132); Nashville, TN
December 3, 2023*; 4:00 pm, ESPN+		at Morehead State	L 80–87	5–3	Ellis Johnson Arena (1,808); Morehead, KY
December 10, 2023*; 2:00 pm, ESPN+		Tennessee Wesleyan	W 112–51	6–3	McKenzie Arena (2,901); Chattanooga, TN
December 16, 2023*; 8:00 pm		at Alabama A&M	W 88–72	7–3	Alabama A&M Events Center (1,227); Huntsville, AL
December 19, 2023*; 7:00 pm, ESPN+		Gardner–Webb	W 69–66	8–3	McKenzie Arena (3,026); Chattanooga, TN
December 22, 2023*; 2:00 pm, ESPN+		at Milwaukee	L 83–85 ^{OT}	8–4	UW–Milwaukee Panther Arena (1,501); Milwaukee, WI
December 30, 2023*; 5:00 pm, SECN		at Auburn	L 66–101	8–5	Neville Arena (9,121); Auburn, AL
SoCon Regular season
January 3, 2024; 7:30 pm, ESPN+		at Samford	L 74–89	8–6 (0–1)	Pete Hanna Center (1,083); Homewood, AL
January 6, 2024; 7:00 pm, ESPN+		Furman	W 73–58	9–6 (1–1)	McKenzie Arena (3,901); Chattanooga, TN
January 11, 2024; 7:00 pm, ESPN+		VMI	W 109–61	10–6 (2–1)	McKenzie Arena (3,241); Chattanooga, TN
January 13, 2024; 7:00 pm, CBSSN		UNC Greensboro	L 54–70	10–7 (2–2)	McKenzie Arena (3,438); Chattanooga, TN
January 17, 2024; 7:00 pm, ESPN+		at Mercer	W 74–60	11–7 (3–2)	Hawkins Arena (1,872); Macon, GA
January 21, 2024; 3:00 pm, ESPN2		at East Tennessee State	W 81–74	12–7 (4–2)	Freedom Hall Civic Center (4,869); Johnson City, TN
January 24, 2024; 7:00 pm, ESPN+		at Wofford	W 79–65	13–7 (5–2)	Jerry Richardson Indoor Stadium (1,146); Spartanburg, SC
January 27, 2024; 2:00 pm, ESPN+		The Citadel	W 90–62	14–7 (6–2)	McKenzie Arena (3,503); Chattanooga, TN
January 31, 2024; 7:00 pm, ESPN+		at Western Carolina	W 91–85	15–7 (7–2)	Ramsey Center (1,895); Cullowhee, NC
February 3, 2024; 4:30 pm, ESPN+		Samford	L 56–78	15–8 (7–3)	McKenzie Arena (4,000); Chattanooga, TN
February 8, 2024; 7:00 pm, ESPN+		at VMI	W 88–84	16–8 (8–3)	Cameron Hall (2,365); Lexington, VA
February 10, 2024; 4:00 pm, ESPN+		at UNC Greensboro	W 89–61	17–8 (9–3)	Greensboro Coliseum (2,329); Greensboro, NC
February 14, 2024; 7:00 pm, ESPN+		East Tennessee State	W 84–71	18–8 (10–3)	McKenzie Arena (3,025); Chattanooga, TN
February 18, 2024; 2:00 pm, CBSSN		at Furman	L 65–82	18–9 (10–4)	Timmons Arena (2,377); Greenville, SC
February 21, 2024; 7:00 pm, ESPN+		Wofford	W 81–65	19–9 (11–4)	McKenzie Arena (3,019); Chattanooga, TN
February 24, 2024; 1:00 pm, ESPN+		at The Citadel	L 62–71	19–10 (11–5)	McAlister Field House (1,553); Charleston, SC
February 28, 2024; 7:00 pm, ESPN+		Mercer	W 84–75	20–10 (12–5)	McKenzie Arena (3,054); Chattanooga, TN
March 2, 2024; 2:00 pm, ESPN+		Western Carolina	L 63–82	20–11 (12–6)	McKenzie Arena (3,874); Chattanooga, TN
SoCon tournament
March 9, 2024; 6:00 pm, ESPN+	(3)	vs. (6) Wofford; Quarterfinals	W 75–57	21–11	Harrah's Cherokee Center; Asheville, NC
March 10, 2024; 6:30 pm, ESPNU	(3)	vs. (7) East Tennessee State; Semifinals	L 84–85 ^{OT}	21–12	Harrah's Cherokee Center; Asheville, NC
*Non-conference game. ^{#}Rankings from AP Poll. (#) Tournament seedings in parentheses. All times are in Eastern.
