= 2023–24 The Citadel Bulldogs basketball team =

American college basketball season

2023–24 The Citadel Bulldogs basketball
- Conference: Southern Conference
- Record: 11–21 (3–15 SoCon)
- Head coach: Ed Conroy (2nd season, 6th overall)
- Assistant coaches: John Reynolds; Patrick Reilingh; Cameron Wells
- Home arena: McAlister Field House

2023–24 Southern Conference men's basketball standings
	Conf.				Overall
Team	W		L	PCT	W		L	PCT
Samford †	15	–	3	.833	29	–	6	.829
UNC Greensboro	12	–	6	.667	21	–	11	.656
Chattanooga	12	–	6	.667	21	–	12	.636
Western Carolina	11	–	7	.611	22	–	10	.688
Furman	10	–	8	.556	17	–	16	.515
Wofford	10	–	8	.556	17	–	15	.531
East Tennessee State	8	–	10	.444	19	–	16	.543
Mercer	8	–	10	.444	16	–	17	.485
The Citadel	3	–	15	.167	11	–	21	.344
VMI	1	–	17	.056	4	–	28	.125
† 2024 SoCon tournament winner

The 2023–24 The Citadel Bulldogs basketball team represented The Citadel during the 2023–24 NCAA Division I men's basketball season. The Bulldogs, led by head coach Ed Conroy in his second season of his second stint with the team, and his sixth season overall, played their home games at McAlister Field House in Charleston, South Carolina as members of the Southern Conference (SoCon). The Bulldogs finished the season 11–21, 3–15 in SoCon play, to finish in ninth place. They were defeated by Mercer in the first round of the SoCon tournament for the second straight year.

== Previous season ==
The Bulldogs finished the 2022–23 season 10–22, 5–13 in SoCon play, to finish in ninth place. They were defeated by Mercer in the first round of the SoCon tournament.

== Roster ==
2023–24 The Citadel Bulldogs men's basketball team
Players
Coaches

Pos.	#	Name	Height	Weight	Year	Hometown
G	0	Marcus Pigram	6 ft 3 in (1.91 m)	200 lb (91 kg)	Fr	Chicago, IL
G	1	AJ Smith	6 ft 4 in (1.93 m)	215 lb (98 kg)	So	Charlotte, NC
F	2	Winston Hill	6 ft 7 in (2.01 m)	245 lb (111 kg)	GS	Irmo, SC
G	3	Madison Durr	6 ft 4 in (1.93 m)	200 lb (91 kg)	So	Atlanta, GA
G	4	Elijah Morgan	6 ft 1 in (1.85 m)	180 lb (82 kg)	GS	New Orleans, LA
G/F	5	Kam Roberts	6 ft 6 in (1.98 m)	220 lb (100 kg)	Fr	South Boston, VA
F	10	Christian Moore	6 ft 6 in (1.98 m)	230 lb (104 kg)	Fr	Los Angeles, CA
G	11	Levi Birkholz	6 ft 3 in (1.91 m)	195 lb (88 kg)	Fr	Lake Mills, WI
G	12	Colby McAllister	6 ft 5 in (1.96 m)	195 lb (88 kg)	So	Spanish Fort, AL
G	20	Josh Davis	6 ft 2 in (1.88 m)	175 lb (79 kg)	So	Southlake, TX
F	21	Cole Alexander	6 ft 6 in (1.98 m)	210 lb (95 kg)	So	Charleston, SC
G	22	Keynan Davis	6 ft 5 in (1.96 m)	200 lb (91 kg)	Fr	Chicago, IL
F	23	Tony Carpio	6 ft 8 in (2.03 m)	220 lb (100 kg)	So	Suwanee, GA
G	24	Rowan Irelan	6 ft 3 in (1.91 m)	190 lb (86 kg)	Fr	Mount Pleasant, SC
C	32	Quinn Nielsen	6 ft 11 in (2.11 m)	250 lb (113 kg)	Fr	Hingham, MA
F	42	Quentin Millora-Brown	6 ft 10 in (2.08 m)	245 lb (111 kg)	GS	Lorton, VA

Head coach

- Ed Conroy (The Citadel)

Assistant coach(es)

- John Reynolds (The Citadel)
- Patrick Reilingh (Louisville)
- Cameron Wells (The Citadel)

Legend

- (C) Team captain
- (S) Suspended
- (I) Ineligible
- (W) Walk-on
- Injured
- Current redshirt

Roster
Last update: October 25, 2023

== Schedule and results ==
Date time, TV	Rank^{#}	Opponent^{#}	Result	Record	Site (attendance) city, state
Exhibition
October 29, 2023*; 4:00 p.m.		Newberry	W 91–74	–	McAlister Field House; Charleston, SC
Non-conference regular season
November 6, 2023*; 7:00 p.m., ACCNX/ESPN+		at NC State	L 59–72	0–1	PNC Arena (12,488); Raleigh, NC
November 10, 2023*; 7:00 p.m., ESPN+		Boston College	L 71–75	0–2	McAlister Field House (3,337); Charleston, SC
November 13, 2023*; 7:00 p.m., ESPN+		at Presbyterian	L 64–71	0–3	Templeton Physical Education Center (514); Clinton, SC
November 16, 2023*; 7:00 p.m., ESPN+		North Greenville	W 77–59	1–3	McAlister Field House (1,027); Charleston, SC
November 20, 2023*; 4:00 p.m.		vs. Idaho State; Campbell Classic	W 62–61	2–3	Gore Arena (51); Buies Creek, NC
November 21, 2023*; 4:00 p.m.		vs. North Carolina Central; Campbell Classic	W 67–61	3–3	Gore Arena; Buies Creek, NC
November 22, 2023*; 5:00 p.m.		at Campbell	L 58–65	3–4	Gore Arena (901); Buies Creek, NC
November 28, 2023*; 7:00 p.m., ESPN+		Charleston Southern	W 81–52	4–4	McAlister Field House (1,527); Charleston, SC
December 2, 2023*; 2:00 p.m.		at North Carolina A&T	W 85–68	5–4	Corbett Sports Center (2,357); Greensboro, NC
December 5, 2023*; 7:00 p.m., ESPN+		Pfeiffer	W 88–60	6–4	McAlister Field House (1,377); Charleston, SC
December 14, 2023*; 7:00 p.m.		at College of Charleston	L 71–86	6–5	TD Arena (4,911); Charleston, SC
December 19, 2023*; 6:00 p.m., ACCN		at Notre Dame	W 65–45	7–5	Joyce Center (4,377); Notre Dame, IN
December 30, 2023*; 1:00 p.m., ESPN+		Toccoa Falls	W 106–76	8–5	McAlister Field House (1,207); Charleston, SC
SoCon regular season
January 3, 2024; 7:00 p.m., ESPN+		Western Carolina	L 71–80	8–6 (0–1)	McAlister Field House (1,233); Charleston, SC
January 6, 2024; 1:00 p.m., ESPN+		Samford	L 64–80	8–7 (0–2)	McAlister Field House (1,647); Charleston, SC
January 10, 2024; 7:00 p.m., ESPN+		at Furman	L 68–82	8–8 (0–3)	Timmons Arena (2,037); Greenville, SC
January 13, 2024; 1:00 p.m., ESPN+		Wofford	L 71–72	8–9 (0–4)	McAlister Field House (2,267); Charleston, SC
January 17, 2024; 7:00 p.m., ESPN+		at UNC Greensboro	L 67–73	8–10 (0–5)	Greensboro Coliseum (1,102); Greensboro, NC
January 20, 2024; 1:00 p.m., ESPN+		at VMI	L 63–70	8–11 (0–6)	Cameron Hall (4,417); Lexington, VA
January 24, 2024; 7:00 p.m., ESPN+		Mercer	W 68–66	9–11 (1–6)	McAlister Field House (1,283); Charleston, SC
January 27, 2024; 2:00 p.m., ESPN+		at Chattanooga	L 62–90	9–12 (1–7)	McKenzie Arena (3,503); Chattanooga, TN
January 31, 2024; 7:00 p.m., ESPN+		Furman	L 79–82 ^{OT}	9–13 (1–8)	McAlister Field House (4,117); Charleston, SC
February 3, 2024; 4:00 p.m., ESPN+		at East Tennessee State	L 60–62	9–14 (1–9)	Freedom Hall Civic Center (3,615); Johnson City, TN
February 7, 2024; 7:00 p.m., ESPN+		at Western Carolina	L 64–71	9–15 (1–10)	Ramsey Center (1,849); Cullowhee, NC
February 10, 2024; 7:00 p.m., ESPN+		at Wofford	L 64–77	9–16 (1–11)	Jerry Richardson Indoor Stadium (2,023); Spartanburg, SC
February 14, 2024; 7:00 p.m., ESPN+		UNC Greensboro	L 61–76	9–17 (1–12)	McAlister Field House (1,745); Charleston, SC
February 17, 2024; 1:00 p.m., ESPN+		VMI	W 76–51	10–17 (2–12)	McAlister Field House (2,337); Charleston, SC
February 21, 2024; 7:00 p.m., ESPN+		at Mercer	L 78–87	10–18 (2–13)	Hawkins Arena (1,514); Macon, GA
February 24, 2024; 1:00 p.m., ESPN+		Chattanooga	W 71–62	11–18 (3–13)	McAlister Field House (1,553); Charleston, SC
February 28, 2024; 7:00 p.m., ESPN+		East Tennessee State	L 63–81	11–19 (3–14)	McAlister Field House (1,973); Charleston, SC
March 2, 2024; 12:00 p.m., ESPN+		at Samford	L 80–92	11–20 (3–15)	Pete Hanna Center (1,946); Homewood, AL
SoCon tournament
March 8, 2024; 5:00 p.m., ESPN+	(9)	vs. (8) Mercer; First round	L 76–84	11–21	Harrah's Cherokee Center; Asheville, NC
*Non-conference game. ^{#}Rankings from AP poll. (#) Tournament seedings in parentheses. All times are in Eastern.
