= 2023–24 Furman Paladins men's basketball team =

2023–24 Furman Paladins men's basketball
- Conference: Southern Conference
- Record: 17–16 (10–8 SoCon)
- Head coach: Bob Richey (7th season)
- Associate head coach: Jeremy Growe
- Assistant coaches: Tim Johnson; Chad Warner; Jake DeLaney
- Home arena: Timmons Arena

2023–24 Southern Conference men's basketball standings
| | Conf. | | | | Overall |
| Team | W | | L | PCT | W | | L | PCT |
|---|---|---|---|---|---|---|---|---|
| Samford † | 15 | – | 3 | .833 | 29 | – | 6 | .829 |
| UNC Greensboro | 12 | – | 6 | .667 | 21 | – | 11 | .656 |
| Chattanooga | 12 | – | 6 | .667 | 21 | – | 12 | .636 |
| Western Carolina | 11 | – | 7 | .611 | 22 | – | 10 | .688 |
| Furman | 10 | – | 8 | .556 | 17 | – | 16 | .515 |
| Wofford | 10 | – | 8 | .556 | 17 | – | 15 | .531 |
| East Tennessee State | 8 | – | 10 | .444 | 19 | – | 16 | .543 |
| Mercer | 8 | – | 10 | .444 | 16 | – | 17 | .485 |
| The Citadel | 3 | – | 15 | .167 | 11 | – | 21 | .344 |
| VMI | 1 | – | 17 | .056 | 4 | – | 28 | .125 |
† 2024 SoCon tournament winner

The 2023–24 Furman Paladins men's basketball team represented Furman University during the 2023–24 NCAA Division I men's basketball season. The Paladins, led by seventh-year head coach Bob Richey, played their home games at Timmons Arena in Greenville, South Carolina as members of the Southern Conference (SoCon).

== Previous season ==
The Paladins finished the 2022–23 season 28–8, 15–3 in SoCon play, to finish as SoCon regular-season champions. In the SoCon tournament, they defeated Mercer and Western Carolina to reach the championship game. In the championship game, they defeated defending SoCon tournament champion Chattanooga to make the NCAA tournament, their first tournament appearance since 1980. As the #13 seed in the South Region, they upset #4 region seed Virginia in the first round of the NCAA tournament, before falling to #5 region seed and eventual tournament runner-up San Diego State in the second round.

== Roster ==
2023–24 Furman Paladins men's basketball team
Players
Coaches

| Pos. | # | Name | Height | Weight | Year | Hometown |
|---|---|---|---|---|---|---|
| G | 0 | PJay Jr. Smith | 6 ft 0 in (1.83 m) | 175 lb (79 kg) | Jr | La Vergne, TN |
| G | 1 | JP Pegues | 6 ft 1 in (1.85 m) | 185 lb (84 kg) | Jr | Nashville, TN |
| G | 2 | Eddrin Bronson | 6 ft 4 in (1.93 m) | 184 lb (83 kg) | Fr | Tampa, FL |
| F | 4 | Ben VanderWal | 6 ft 7 in (2.01 m) | 210 lb (95 kg) | So | Elmhurst, IL |
| G | 5 | Marcus Foster | 6 ft 4 in (1.93 m) | 200 lb (91 kg) | RS Sr | Atlanta, GA |
| G | 10 | Tommy Humphries | 6 ft 5 in (1.96 m) | 215 lb (98 kg) | Fr | Minneapolis, MN |
| G | 11 | Carter Whitt | 6 ft 3 in (1.91 m) | 185 lb (84 kg) | Jr | Raleigh, NC |
| F | 12 | Davis Molnar | 6 ft 6 in (1.98 m) | 215 lb (98 kg) | RS Fr | Fayetteville, NC |
| F | 13 | Garrett Hien | 6 ft 9 in (2.06 m) | 220 lb (100 kg) | Sr | Concord, NC |
| G | 14 | Jeremy Burr | 6 ft 2 in (1.88 m) | 170 lb (77 kg) | Fr | Greenville, SC |
| F | 15 | Tyrese Hughey | 6 ft 6 in (1.98 m) | 220 lb (100 kg) | Jr | Columbus, OH |
| F | 21 | Cooper Bowser | 6 ft 11 in (2.11 m) | 210 lb (95 kg) | Fr | Woodbridge, VA |
| G | 22 | Cason Collins | 6 ft 3 in (1.91 m) | 180 lb (82 kg) | Fr | Morehead City, NC |
| F | 24 | Alex Williams | 6 ft 5 in (1.96 m) | 235 lb (107 kg) | Jr | Xenia, OH |
| F | 30 | Thomas Tillman | 6 ft 6 in (1.98 m) | 200 lb (91 kg) | So | Charleston, SC |

Head coach

- Bob Richey (North Greenville)

Assistant coach(es)

- Jeremy Growe (Indiana)
- Tim Johnson (Wofford)
- Chad Warner (Georgia)
- Jake DeLaney (Gardner–Webb)

Legend

- (C) Team captain
- (S) Suspended
- (I) Ineligible
- (W) Walk-on
- Injured
- Current redshirt

Roster
Last update: December 7, 2023

== Schedule and results ==
| Date time, TV | Rank^{#} | Opponent^{#} | Result | Record | Site (attendance) city, state |
Non-conference regular season
| November 6, 2023*; 7:00 p.m., ESPN+ | | North Greenville | W 84–68 | 1–0 | Timmons Arena (2,197); Greenville, SC |
| November 10, 2023*; 7:00 p.m., ESPN+ | | Belmont | W 99–76 | 2–0 | Timmons Arena (2,017); Greenville, SC |
| November 16, 2023*; 7:00 p.m., ESPN+ | | vs. Liberty; Myrtle Beach Invitational first round | L 74–88 | 2–1 | HTC Center (1,499); Conway, SC |
| November 17, 2023*; 6:30 p.m., ESPN+ | | at Coastal Carolina; Myrtle Beach Invitational consolation 2nd round | W 89–80 | 3–1 | HTC Center (1,266); Conway, SC |
| November 19, 2023*; 10:30 a.m., ESPNU | | vs. Wyoming; Myrtle Beach Invitational 5th-place game | L 71–78 | 3–2 | HTC Center (1,136); Conway, SC |
| November 25, 2023*; 6:00 p.m., ESPN+ | | at UAB | L 86–92 | 3–3 | Bartow Arena (2,953); Birmingham, AL |
| November 28, 2023*; 7:00 p.m., ESPN+ | | South Carolina State | W 86–78 | 4–3 | Timmons Arena (1,887); Greenville, SC |
| December 2, 2023*; 2:00 p.m., ESPN+ | | at Princeton | L 69–70 | 4–4 | Jadwin Gymnasium (2,142); Princeton, NJ |
| December 4, 2023*; 8:00 p.m., SECN+/ESPN+ | | at Arkansas | L 83–97 | 4–5 | Bud Walton Arena (19,200); Fayetteville, AR |
| December 9, 2023*; 2:00 p.m., ESPN+ | | Bob Jones | W 100–58 | 5–5 | Timmons Arena (1,887); Greenville, SC |
| December 14, 2023*; 7:00 p.m., ESPN+ | | at Tulane | L 110–117 ^{2OT} | 5–6 | Devlin Fieldhouse; New Orleans, LA |
| December 19, 2023*; 7:00 p.m., ESPN+ | | Presbyterian | W 76–61 | 6–6 | Timmons Arena (1,817); Greenville, SC |
| December 30, 2023*; 2:00 p.m., ESPN+ | | Anderson | L 74–79 | 6–7 | Timmons Arena (2,107); Greenville, SC |
SoCon regular season
| January 3, 2024; 7:00 p.m., ESPN+ | | at UNC Greensboro | L 68–79 | 6–8 (0–1) | Greensboro Coliseum (1,412); Greensboro, NC |
| January 6, 2024; 7:00 p.m., ESPN+ | | at Chattanooga | L 58–73 | 6–9 (0–2) | McKenzie Arena (3,901); Chattanooga, TN |
| January 10, 2024; 7:00 p.m., ESPN+ | | The Citadel | W 82–68 | 7–9 (1–2) | Timmons Arena (2,037); Greenville, SC |
| January 13, 2024; 2:00 p.m., ESPN+ | | East Tennessee State | W 82–73 | 8–9 (2–2) | Timmons Arena (2,279); Greenville, SC |
| January 17, 2024; 6:00 p.m., ESPN+ | | at VMI | W 100–60 | 9–9 (3–2) | Cameron Hall (329); Lexington, VA |
| January 20, 2024; 2:00 p.m., ESPN+ | | Western Carolina | W 65–62 | 10–9 (4–2) | Timmons Arena (2,517); Greenville, SC |
| January 24, 2024; 7:00 p.m., ESPN+ | | Samford | W 78–68 | 11–9 (5–2) | Timmons Arena (2,207); Greenville, SC |
| January 27, 2024; 6:00 p.m., ESPN+ | | at Wofford | L 67–77 | 11–10 (5–3) | Jerry Richardson Indoor Stadium (3,500); Spartanburg, SC |
| January 31, 2024; 7:00 p.m., ESPN+ | | at The Citadel | W 82–79 ^{OT} | 12–10 (6–3) | McAlister Field House (4,117); Charleston, SC |
| February 4, 2024; 2:00 p.m., ESPNU | | UNC Greensboro | L 87–89 | 12–11 (6–4) | Timmons Arena (2,438); Greenville, SC |
| February 7, 2024; 7:00 p.m., ESPN+ | | at Mercer | L 69–78 | 12–12 (6–5) | Hawkins Arena (1,989); Macon, GA |
| February 10, 2024; 6:00 p.m., CBSSN | | at East Tennessee State | W 65–63 | 13–12 (7–5) | Freedom Hall Civic Center (4,566); Johnson City, TN |
| February 14, 2024; 7:00 p.m., ESPN+ | | VMI | W 75–62 | 14–12 (8–5) | Timmons Arena (1,947); Greenville, SC |
| February 18, 2024; 2:00 p.m., CBSSN | | Chattanooga | W 82–65 | 15–12 (9–5) | Timmons Arena (2,377); Greenville, SC |
| February 21, 2024; 7:30 p.m., ESPN+ | | at Samford | L 72–74 | 15–13 (9–6) | Pete Hanna Center (2,531); Homewood, AL |
| February 24, 2024; 2:00 p.m., ESPN+ | | Wofford | W 82–67 | 16–13 (10–6) | Timmons Arena (2,547); Greenville, SC |
| February 28, 2024; 7:00 p.m., ESPNU | | at Western Carolina | L 77–85 | 16–14 (10–7) | Ramsey Center (3,159); Cullowhee, NC |
| March 2, 2024; 2:00 p.m., ESPN+ | | Mercer | L 75–82 | 16–15 (10–8) | Timmons Arena (2,457); Greenville, SC |
SoCon tournament
| March 9, 2024; 8:30 p.m., ESPN+/Nexstar | (5) | vs. (4) Western Carolina; Quarterfinals | W 79–76 ^{OT} | 17–15 | Harrah's Cherokee Center; Asheville, NC |
| March 10, 2024; 4:00 p.m., ESPNU | (5) | vs. (1) Samford; Semifinals | L 77–84 | 17–16 | Harrah's Cherokee Center; Asheville, NC |
*Non-conference game. ^{#}Rankings from AP poll. (#) Tournament seedings in parentheses. All times are in Eastern.
