= 2023–24 UNC Greensboro Spartans men's basketball team =

American college basketball season

2023–24 UNC Greensboro Spartans men's basketball
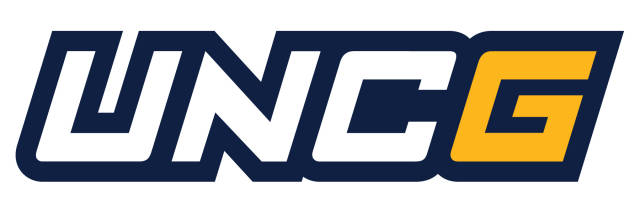

Nassau Championship champions
- Conference: Southern Conference
- Record: 21–11 (12–6 SoCon)
- Head coach: Mike Jones (3rd season)
- Assistant coaches: Donny Lind; Bryant Stith; Brett Gilbert
- Home arena: Greensboro Coliseum Complex; Fleming Gymnasium

2023–24 Southern Conference men's basketball standings
	Conf.				Overall
Team	W		L	PCT	W		L	PCT
Samford †	15	–	3	.833	29	–	6	.829
UNC Greensboro	12	–	6	.667	21	–	11	.656
Chattanooga	12	–	6	.667	21	–	12	.636
Western Carolina	11	–	7	.611	22	–	10	.688
Furman	10	–	8	.556	17	–	16	.515
Wofford	10	–	8	.556	17	–	15	.531
East Tennessee State	8	–	10	.444	19	–	16	.543
Mercer	8	–	10	.444	16	–	17	.485
The Citadel	3	–	15	.167	11	–	21	.344
VMI	1	–	17	.056	4	–	28	.125
† 2024 SoCon tournament winner

The 2023–24 UNC Greensboro Spartans men's basketball team represented the University of North Carolina at Greensboro during the 2023–24 NCAA Division I men's basketball season. The Spartans, led by third-year head coach Mike Jones, played their home games at the Greensboro Coliseum and Fleming Gymnasium in Greensboro, North Carolina as members of the Southern Conference (SoCon).

== Previous season ==
The Spartans finished the 2022–23 NCAA Division I men's basketball season with a record of 20–12, 14–4 in SoCon play, to finish in third place. As the No. 3 seed in the SoCon tournament, they lost to Wofford in the quarterfinals.

Guard Keyshaun Langley was named to both the Southern Conference Coaches and Sports Media Association First Team. His brother Kobe Langley, also a guard, was named SoCon Defensive Player of the Year. Guard Keondre Kennedy was named to the Coaches Third Team and coach Mike Jones was named the SoCon Coach of the Year.

== Offseason ==
=== Departing players ===
Departing players
Name	Number	Position	Height	Weight	Year	Hometown	Notes
Cortez Johnson Jr.	15	F	6'7"	198	Freshman	Baltimore, MD	Transferred to Clarendon College
Bas Leyte	33	F	6'10"	220	Senior	Bergen op Zoom, Netherlands	Graduated, transferred to Clemson
Mohammed Abdulsalam	4	F	6'9"	255	Graduate student	Ibadan, Nigeria	Completed college eligibility
Keondre Kennedy	24	G	6'6"	180	Graduate student	Atlanta, GA	Completed college eligibility
Dante Treacy	11	G	6'0"	175	Graduate student	Orlando, FL	Completed college eligibility
Jalen White	14	F	6'4"	240	Senior	St. Petersburg, FL	Graduated

=== Incoming transfers ===
Incoming transfers
Name	Position	Height	Weight	Year	Hometown	Previous school
Tim Ceaser	F	6'9"	210	Senior	Marion, AR	Utah Valley
Muon Reath	F	6'8"	185	Junior	Ottawa, ON	South Plains
Jaylen Gibson	G	6'9"	210	Junior	Zebulon, NC	Winston-Salem State

=== 2023 recruiting class ===
College recruiting information
Name	Hometown	School	Height	Weight	Commit date
Mason So; PG	Arlington, VA	DeMatha Catholic High School	6 ft 2 in (1.88 m)	180 lb (82 kg)	Jul 14, 2022
Mason So; PG	Recruit ratings: No ratings found				
Domas Kauzonas; PF	Vilnius, Lithuania	Rabun Gap-Nacoochee School	6 ft 10 in (2.08 m)	240 lb (110 kg)	Nov 12, 2022
Domas Kauzonas; PF	Recruit ratings: No ratings found				
Overall recruit ranking:
Note: In many cases, Scout, Rivals, 247Sports, On3, and ESPN may conflict in their listings of height and weight.; In these cases, the average was taken. ESPN grades are on a 100-point scale.; Sources: "2022 Team Ranking". Rivals.

== Roster ==
2023–24 UNC Greensboro Spartans men's basketball team
Players
Coaches

Pos.	#	Name	Height	Weight	Year	Hometown
G	0	Keyshaun Langley	6 ft 1 in (1.85 m)	175 lb (79 kg)	GS	High Point, NC
F	2	Mikael Brown-Jones	6 ft 8 in (2.03 m)	220 lb (100 kg)	Sr	Philadelphia, PA
G	3	Kobe Langley	6 ft 1 in (1.85 m)	180 lb (82 kg)	GS	High Point, NC
G	4	Mason So	6 ft 2 in (1.88 m)	180 lb (82 kg)	Fr	Arlington, VA
F	11	Jaylon Gibson	6 ft 9 in (2.06 m)	225 lb (102 kg)	Jr	Zebulon, NC
G	12	Donovan Atwell	6 ft 5 in (1.96 m)	187 lb (85 kg)	So	Huntersville, NC
F	13	Miles Jones (W)	6 ft 6 in (1.98 m)	215 lb (98 kg)	GS	Radford, VA
G	14	Keyon Webb (W)	6 ft 2 in (1.88 m)	185 lb (84 kg)	Fr	Durham, NC
G	20	Joryam Saizonou	6 ft 3 in (1.91 m)	188 lb (85 kg)	Jr	Almere, Netherlands
F	22	Jalen Breath	6 ft 9 in (2.06 m)	225 lb (102 kg)	RS So	Moore, OK
F	24	Tim Ceaser	6 ft 9 in (2.06 m)	205 lb (93 kg)	Sr	Marion, AR
G	25	Jevon Johnson	6 ft 3 in (1.91 m)	170 lb (77 kg)	RS So	Durham, NC
F	33	Muon Reath	6 ft 8 in (2.03 m)	185 lb (84 kg)	Jr	Ottawa, ON
F	34	Domas Kauzonas	6 ft 10 in (2.08 m)	240 lb (109 kg)	Fr	Vilnius, Lithuania
G	35	Akrum Ahemed	6 ft 3 in (1.91 m)	190 lb (86 kg)	RS Jr	Hackensack, NJ

Head coach

- Mike Jones (Howard)

Assistant coach(es)

- Donny Lind (Loyola (MD))
- Brett Gilbert (Lebanon Valley)
- Bryant Stith (Virginia)

Legend

- (C) Team captain
- (S) Suspended
- (I) Ineligible
- (W) Walk-on
- Injured
- Current redshirt

Roster
Last update: August 7, 2023

== Schedule and results ==
Date time, TV	Rank^{#}	Opponent^{#}	Result	Record	High points	High rebounds	High assists	Site (attendance) city, state
Non-conference regular season
November 10, 2023*; 7:00 p.m., ESPN+		North Carolina A&T; Battle of Market Street	W 94–78	1–0	18 – Atwell	13 – Brown-Jones	10 – Ko. Langley	Greensboro Coliseum (3,132); Greensboro, NC
November 14, 2023*; 8:00 p.m., SECN/ESPN+		at Vanderbilt	L 70–74	1–1	26 – Ke. Langley	8 – Breath	6 – Ko. Langley	Memorial Gymnasium (5,175); Nashville, TN
November 17, 2023*; 8:00 p.m., SECN/ESPN+		at No. 14 Arkansas	W 78–72	2–1	23 – Ke. Langley	5 – tied	5 – Ke. Langley	Bud Walton Arena (19,200); Fayetteville, AR
November 24, 2023*; 11:00 a.m., FloSports		vs. Kansas City; Nassau Championship first round	W 76–64	3–1	26 – Atwell	7 – Brown-Jones	9 – Ko. Langley	Baha Mar Convention Center; Nassau, Bahamas
November 25, 2023*; 4:30 p.m., FloSports		vs. Delaware; Nassau Championship semifinals	W 88–77	4–1	18 – Brown-Jones	8 – tied	5 – Ko. Langley	Baha Mar Convention Center; Nassau, Bahamas
November 26, 2023*; 7:00 p.m., FloSports		vs. UIC; Nassau Championship final	W 58–57	5–1	15 – Brown-Jones	9 – Brown-Jones	3 – Ko. Langley	Baha Mar Convention Center; Nassau, Bahamas
December 1, 2023*; 7:00 p.m., ESPN+		William Peace	W 88–56	6–1	22 – Brown-Jones	7 – Brown-Jones	10 – Ko. Langley	Fleming Gymnasium (856); Greensboro, NC
December 7, 2023*; 7:00 p.m., ESPN+		Eastern Kentucky	W 87–85 ^{OT}	7–1	24 – Atwell	7 – Brown-Jones	7 – Ko. Langley	Fleming Gymnasium (697); Greensboro, NC
December 10, 2023*; 4:30 p.m., ESPN+		Elon	W 82–73	8–1	27 – Brown-Jones	11 – Brown-Jones	4 – Ko. Langley	Greensboro Coliseum (1,484); Greensboro, NC
December 16, 2023*; 7:00 p.m., ESPN+		at Marshall	L 65–72	8–2	26 – Ke. Langley	11 – Ceasar	6 – Ke. Langley	Cam Henderson Center (3,933); Huntington, WV
December 19, 2023*; 7:00 p.m., ESPN+		at High Point	L 63–74	8–3	14 – Ko. Langley	8 – Ceaser	7 – Ko. Langley	Qubein Center (3,617); High Point, NC
December 21, 2023*; 3:00 p.m., ESPN+		VUL	W 135–57	9–3	19 – Atwell	9 – tied	6 – Saizonou	Fleming Gymnasium (352); Greensboro, NC
December 29, 2023*; 8:00 p.m., LHN		at No. 21 Texas	L 37–72	9–4	15 – Ke. Langley	8 – Breath	3 – Ke. Langley	Moody Center (10,616); Austin, TX
SoCon regular season
January 3, 2024; 7:00 p.m., ESPN+		Furman	W 79–69	10–4 (1–0)	17 – tied	11 – Brown-Jones	7 – Ko. Langley	Greensboro Coliseum (1,412); Greensboro, NC
January 6, 2024; 4:00 p.m., ESPN+		East Tennessee State	W 70–54	11–4 (2–0)	14 – Brown-Jones	11 – Breath	8 – Ko. Langley	Greensboro Coliseum (1,182); Greensboro, NC
January 11, 2024; 8:00 p.m., ESPN+		at Samford	L 70–79	11–5 (2–1)	20 – Brown-Jones	9 – Brown-Jones	6 – Ko. Langley	Pete Hanna Center (2,317); Homewood, AL
January 13, 2024; 7:00 p.m., CBSSN		at Chattanooga	W 70–54	12–5 (3–1)	17 – Ke. Langley	5 – Jones	11 – Ko. Langley	McKenzie Arena (3,438); Chattanooga, TN
January 17, 2024; 7:00 p.m., ESPN+		The Citadel	W 73–67	13–5 (4–1)	39 – Brown-Jones	9 – Breath	6 – Ko. Langley	Greensboro Coliseum (1,102); Greensboro, NC
January 20, 2024; 4:00 p.m., ESPN+		Wofford	W 82–59	14–5 (5–1)	29 – Brown-Jones	10 – Brown-Jones	7 – Ko. Langley	Greensboro Coliseum (1,902); Greensboro, NC
January 24, 2024; 7:00 p.m., ESPN+		at Western Carolina	W 85–82 ^{OT}	15–5 (6–1)	39 – Brown-Jones	11 – Breath	7 – Ko. Langley	Ramsey Center (2,945); Cullowhee, NC
January 27, 2024; 7:00 p.m., ESPN+		Mercer	L 64–70	15–6 (6–2)	19 – Brown-Jones	16 – Brown-Jones	4 – Ko. Langley	Greensboro Coliseum (1,686); Greensboro, NC
January 31, 2024; 7:00 p.m., ESPN+		at VMI	W 85–79	16–6 (7–2)	18 – tied	8 – tied	4 – Ke. Langley	Cameron Hall (1,126); Lexington, VA
February 3, 2024; 2:00 p.m., ESPNU		at Furman	W 89–87	17–6 (8–2)	20 – Ke. Langley	6 – Ceaser	5 – tied	Timmons Arena (2,438); Greenville, SC
February 8, 2024; 7:00 p.m., ESPNU		Samford	L 69–78	17–7 (8–3)	19 – Ke. Langley	11 – Brown-Jones	6 – Ko. Langley	Greensboro Coliseum (2,023); Greensboro, NC
February 10, 2024; 4:00 p.m., ESPN+		Chattanooga	L 61–89	17–8 (8–4)	25 – Brown-Jones	8 – Brown-Jones	6 – Ko. Langley	Greensboro Coliseum (2,329); Greensboro, NC
February 14, 2024; 7:00 p.m., ESPN+		at The Citadel	W 76–61	18–8 (9–4)	21 – Ke. Langley	8 – Breath	7 – Ko. Langley	McAlister Field House (1,745); Charleston, SC
February 17, 2024; 7:00 p.m., ESPN+		at Wofford	W 58–47	19–8 (10–4)	15 – Atwell	9 – Breath	7 – Ke. Langley	Jerry Richardson Indoor Stadium (2,074); Spartanburg, SC
February 21, 2024; 6:00 p.m., CBSSN		Western Carolina	W 71–65	20–8 (11–4)	19 – tied	8 – Brown-Jones	4 – Ko. Langley	Greensboro Coliseum (1,730); Greensboro, NC
February 24, 2024; 4:30 p.m., ESPN+		at Mercer	L 72–86	20–9 (11–5)	18 – Ke. Langley	6 – tied	4 – Ko. Langley	Hawkins Arena (2,772); Macon, GA
February 28, 2024; 7:00 p.m., ESPN+		VMI	W 100–58	21–9 (12–5)	29 – Brown-Jones	9 – Brown-Jones	5 – Ke. Langley	Greensboro Coliseum (1,210); Greensboro, NC
March 2, 2024; 4:00 p.m., ESPN+		at East Tennessee State	L 65–66	21–10 (12–6)	25 – Ke. Langley	10 – Breath	7 – Ko. Langley	Freedom Hall Civic Center (4,451); Johnson City, TN
SoCon tournament
March 9, 2024; 2:30 p.m., ESPN+	(2)	vs. (7) East Tennessee State; Quarterfinals	L 62–73	21–11	11 – Breath	10 – Breath	5 – Ke. Langley	Harrah's Cherokee Center; Asheville, NC
*Non-conference game. ^{#}Rankings from AP poll. (#) Tournament seedings in parentheses. All times are in Eastern.

== Awards and honors ==
=== SoCon Defensive Player of the Year ===
- Kobe Langley

=== SoCon First Team ===
- Mikael Brown-Jones

=== SoCon Second Team ===
- Keyshaun Langley

=== SoCon Third Team ===
- Kobe Langley

=== SoCon All-Defensive Team ===
- Kobe Langley
