= 2023–24 Western Carolina Catamounts men's basketball team =

American college basketball season

2023–24 Western Carolina Catamounts men's basketball
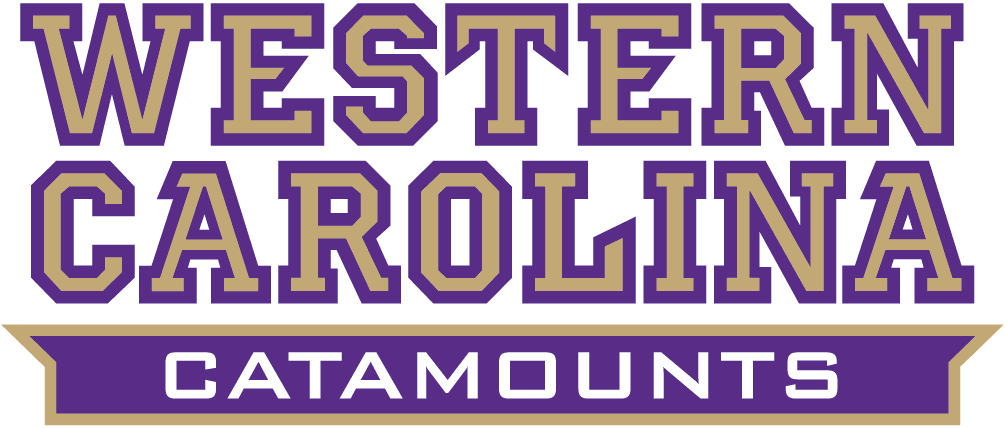
- Conference: Southern Conference
- Record: 22–10 (11–7 SoCon)
- Head coach: Justin Gray (3rd season)
- Associate head coach: Jayson Gee
- Assistant coaches: Ryne Lightfoot; Zack Freesman
- Home arena: Ramsey Center

2023–24 Southern Conference men's basketball standings
| | Conf. | | | | Overall |
| Team | W | | L | PCT | W | | L | PCT |
|---|---|---|---|---|---|---|---|---|
| Samford † | 15 | – | 3 | .833 | 29 | – | 6 | .829 |
| UNC Greensboro | 12 | – | 6 | .667 | 21 | – | 11 | .656 |
| Chattanooga | 12 | – | 6 | .667 | 21 | – | 12 | .636 |
| Western Carolina | 11 | – | 7 | .611 | 22 | – | 10 | .688 |
| Furman | 10 | – | 8 | .556 | 17 | – | 16 | .515 |
| Wofford | 10 | – | 8 | .556 | 17 | – | 15 | .531 |
| East Tennessee State | 8 | – | 10 | .444 | 19 | – | 16 | .543 |
| Mercer | 8 | – | 10 | .444 | 16 | – | 17 | .485 |
| The Citadel | 3 | – | 15 | .167 | 11 | – | 21 | .344 |
| VMI | 1 | – | 17 | .056 | 4 | – | 28 | .125 |
† 2024 SoCon tournament winner

The 2023–24 Western Carolina Catamounts men's basketball team represented Western Carolina University during the 2023–24 NCAA Division I men's basketball season. The Catamounts, led by third-year head coach Justin Gray, played their home games at the Ramsey Center located in Cullowhee, North Carolina, as members of the Southern Conference (SoCon). They finished the season 22–10, 11–7 in SoCon play, to finish in fourth place. They lost in the quarterfinals of the SoCon tournament to Furman.

On March 11, 2024, Justin Gray was named the head coach for Coastal Carolina. Two days later, the school named Gardner–Webb coach Tim Craft the team's new head coach.

== Previous season ==
The Catamounts finished the 2022–23 season 17–14, 10–8 in SoCon play, to finish in fourth place. In the SoCon tournament, they defeated East Tennessee in the quarterfinals before narrowly losing in overtime to Furman in the semifinal round. The Catamounts were invited to the CBI tournament, where they were defeated by eventual champions Charlotte in the first round.

== Roster ==
2023–24 Western Carolina Catamounts men's basketball team
Players
Coaches

| Pos. | # | Name | Height | Weight | Year | Hometown |
|---|---|---|---|---|---|---|
| G | 0 | Kamar Robertson | 6 ft 0 in (1.83 m) | 180 lb (82 kg) | GS | Alpharetta, GA |
| G | 1 | Russell Jones Jr. | 5 ft 8 in (1.73 m) | 175 lb (79 kg) | Sr | Blythewood, SC |
| G | 2 | Vonterius Woolbright | 6 ft 6 in (1.98 m) | 215 lb (98 kg) | Sr | Albany, GA |
| G | 3 | Tre Jackson | 6 ft 1 in (1.85 m) | 175 lb (79 kg) | Sr | Columbia, SC |
| F | 4 | Bernard Pelote | 6 ft 8 in (2.03 m) | 224 lb (102 kg) | RS Jr | Savannah, GA |
| G | 5 | DJ Campbell | 6 ft 2 in (1.88 m) | 205 lb (93 kg) | So | Hampton, VA |
| G | 10 | Keshawn Jr. Brown | 5 ft 10 in (1.78 m) | 162 lb (73 kg) | Fr | Durham, NC |
| G/F | 12 | Cinque Lemon | 6 ft 7 in (2.01 m) | 215 lb (98 kg) | RS Fr | Spring Lake, NC |
| G | 13 | Brandon Scott | 6 ft 4 in (1.93 m) | 188 lb (85 kg) | RS So | Hammond, IN |
| F | 22 | Corneilous Williams | 6 ft 9 in (2.06 m) | 205 lb (93 kg) | RS Fr | Meridian, MS |
| F | 23 | Marcus Kell | 6 ft 8 in (2.03 m) | 213 lb (97 kg) | So | Rock Hill, SC |
| G | 24 | Kamari Jones | 6 ft 4 in (1.93 m) | 177 lb (80 kg) | Fr | Indianapolis, IN |
| F | 32 | Colin Granger | 6 ft 9 in (2.06 m) | 245 lb (111 kg) | RS Jr | Suwanee, GA |
| F | 42 | Charles Lampten | 6 ft 11 in (2.11 m) | 225 lb (102 kg) | GS | Roanoke, TX |
| C | 45 | Kaleb Siler | 6 ft 9 in (2.06 m) | 257 lb (117 kg) | Fr | Fayetteville, NC |

Head coach

- Justin Gray (Wake Forest)

Assistant coach(es)

- Jayson Gee (College of Charleston)
- Ryne Lightfoot (Bethel)
- Zack Freesman (North Florida)

Legend

- (C) Team captain
- (S) Suspended
- (I) Ineligible
- (W) Walk-on
- Injured
- Current redshirt

Roster
Last update: November 22, 2023

== Schedule and results ==
| Date time, TV | Rank^{#} | Opponent^{#} | Result | Record | Site (attendance) city, state |
Non-conference regular season
| November 7, 2023*; 7:00 p.m., ESPN+ | | Dalton State | W 106–65 | 1–0 | Ramsey Center (1,677); Cullowhee, NC |
| November 11, 2023*; 2:00 p.m., ACCNX/ESPN+ | | at Notre Dame | W 71–61 | 2–0 | Joyce Center (5,742); South Bend, IN |
| November 13, 2023*; 7:30 p.m., ESPN+ | | at Middle Tennessee | W 66–64 | 3–0 | Murphy Center (2,806); Murfreesboro, TN |
| November 18, 2023*; 4:00 p.m., ESPN+ | | McNeese | W 76–74 | 4–0 | Ramsey Center (1,916); Cullowhee, NC |
| November 26, 2023*; 4:00 p.m., ESPN+ | | North Alabama | W 81–63 | 5–0 | Ramsey Center (1,765); Cullowhee, NC |
| November 28, 2023*; 7:00 p.m., ESPN+ | | at Tennessee Tech | W 69–65 | 6–0 | Eblen Center (679); Cookeville, TN |
| December 2, 2023*; 7:00 p.m., ESPN+ | | at Gardner–Webb | L 77–82 | 6–1 | Paul Porter Arena (850); Boiling Springs, NC |
| December 5, 2023*; 7:00 p.m., ESPN+ | | at High Point | L 71–97 | 6–2 | Qubein Center (2,476); High Point, NC |
| December 9, 2023*; 4:00 p.m., ESPN+ | | UNC Asheville | W 78–63 | 7–2 | Ramsey Center (2,904); Cullowhee, NC |
| December 16, 2023*; 4:30 p.m., ESPN+ | | at USC Upstate | W 70–53 | 8–2 | G. B. Hodge Center (414); Spartanburg, SC |
| December 19, 2023*; 7:00 p.m., SECN | | at Vanderbilt | W 63–62 | 9–2 | Memorial Gymnasium (5,146); Nashville, TN |
| December 21, 2023*; 11:30 a.m., ESPN+ | | Brescia | W 85–47 | 10–2 | Ramsey Center (7,826); Cullowhee, NC |
| December 30, 2023*; 4:00 p.m., ESPN+ | | King | W 90–62 | 11–2 | Ramsey Center (1,792); Cullowhee, NC |
SoCon regular season
| January 3, 2024; 7:00 p.m., ESPN+ | | at The Citadel | W 80–71 | 12–2 (1–0) | McAlister Field House (1,233); Charleston, SC |
| January 6, 2024; 4:00 p.m., ESPN+ | | Wofford | W 70–66 | 13–2 (2–0) | Ramsey Center (2,008); Cullowhee, NC |
| January 10, 2024; 7:00 p.m., Nexstar/ESPN+ | | at East Tennessee State | W 80–66 | 14–2 (3–0) | Freedom Hall Civic Center (3,423); Johnson City, TN |
| January 13, 2024; 2:00 p.m., ESPN+ | | at Mercer | W 64–52 | 15–2 (4–0) | Hawkins Arena (3,227); Macon, GA |
| January 16, 2024; 6:00 p.m., CBSSN | | Samford | L 71–75 | 15–3 (4–1) | Ramsey Center (5,018); Cullowhee, NC |
| January 20, 2024; 2:00 p.m., ESPN+ | | at Furman | L 62–65 | 15–4 (4–2) | Timmons Arena (2,517); Greenville, SC |
| January 24, 2024; 7:00 p.m., ESPN+ | | UNC Greensboro | L 82–85 ^{OT} | 15–5 (4–3) | Ramsey Center (2,945); Cullowhee, NC |
| January 27, 2024; 5:00 p.m., ESPN+ | | VMI | W 102–77 | 16–5 (5–3) | Ramsey Center (3,860); Cullowhee, NC |
| January 31, 2024; 7:00 p.m., ESPN+ | | Chattanooga | L 85–91 | 16–6 (5–4) | Ramsey Center (1,895); Cullowhee, NC |
| February 3, 2024; 4:00 p.m., ESPN+ | | at Wofford | L 86–88 ^{OT} | 16–7 (5–5) | Jerry Richardson Indoor Stadium (2,051); Spartanburg, SC |
| February 7, 2024; 7:00 p.m., ESPN+ | | The Citadel | W 71–64 | 17–7 (6–5) | Ramsey Center (1,849); Cullowhee, NC |
| February 10, 2024; 4:00 p.m., Nexstar/ESPN+ | | Mercer | W 79–46 | 18–7 (7–5) | Ramsey Center (2,588); Cullowhee, NC |
| February 14, 2024; 9:00 p.m., ESPN2/ESPNU | | at Samford | L 62–88 | 18–8 (7–6) | Pete Hanna Center (1,321); Homewood, AL |
| February 17, 2024; 4:00 p.m., ESPN+ | | East Tennessee State | W 70–65 | 19–8 (8–6) | Ramsey Center (3,231); Cullowhee, NC |
| February 21, 2024; 6:00 p.m., CBSSN | | at UNC Greensboro | L 65–71 | 19–9 (8–7) | Greensboro Coliseum (1,730); Greensboro, NC |
| February 24, 2024; 1:00 p.m., ESPN+ | | at VMI | W 84–51 | 20–9 (9–7) | Cameron Hall (3,287); Lexington, VA |
| February 28, 2024; 7:00 p.m., ESPNU | | Furman | W 85–77 | 21–9 (10–7) | Ramsey Center (3,159); Cullowhee, NC |
| March 2, 2024; 2:00 p.m., ESPN+ | | at Chattanooga | W 82–63 | 22–9 (11–7) | McKenzie Arena (3,874); Chattanooga, TN |
SoCon tournament
| March 9, 2024; 8:30 p.m., ESPN+/Nexstar | (4) | vs. (5) Furman; Quarterfinals | L 76–79 ^{OT} | 22–10 | Harrah's Cherokee Center; Asheville, NC |
*Non-conference game. ^{#}Rankings from AP poll. (#) Tournament seedings in parentheses. All times are in Eastern.
