= Jadyn Parker =

American basketball player

No. 17 – APOEL
- Position: Center
- League: Cyprus Basketball Division A

Personal information
- Born: April 22, 2002 (age 24) Shallotte, North Carolina, U.S.
- Listed height: 6 ft 10 in (2.08 m)
- Listed weight: 200 lb (91 kg)

Career information
- High school: West Brunswick (Shallotte, North Carolina)
- College: North Florida (2020–2023); East Tennessee State (2023–2024)
- NBA draft: 2024: undrafted
- Playing career: 2024–present

Career history
- 2024–present: APOEL

Jadyn Parker (born April 22, 2002) is an American basketball player for APOEL of the Cypriot League.

== High school career ==
Parker attended West Brunswick High School at Shallotte, North Carolina. As a senior, he averaged 21.5 points, 14.3 rebounds and 5.0 blocks per game.

== College career ==
Parker committed to North Florida. During his three seasons with the Ospreys, he was one of the best defensive players of the team. In his last season with North Florida, he averaged 6.8 points, 4.7 rebounds and 1.7 blocks per game.

In 2023, he was transferred to East Tennessee State. With the Buccaneers, he averaged 7.2 points, 6.9 rebounds and 2.3 blocks per game.

== Professional career ==
On September 2, 2024, he joined AEK of the Greek Basket League and the Basketball Champions League (BCL). On November 11, 2024, he left the team without appearing in a single game, and joined APOEL of the Cypriot League.
