= Dan Earl =

American college basketball coach

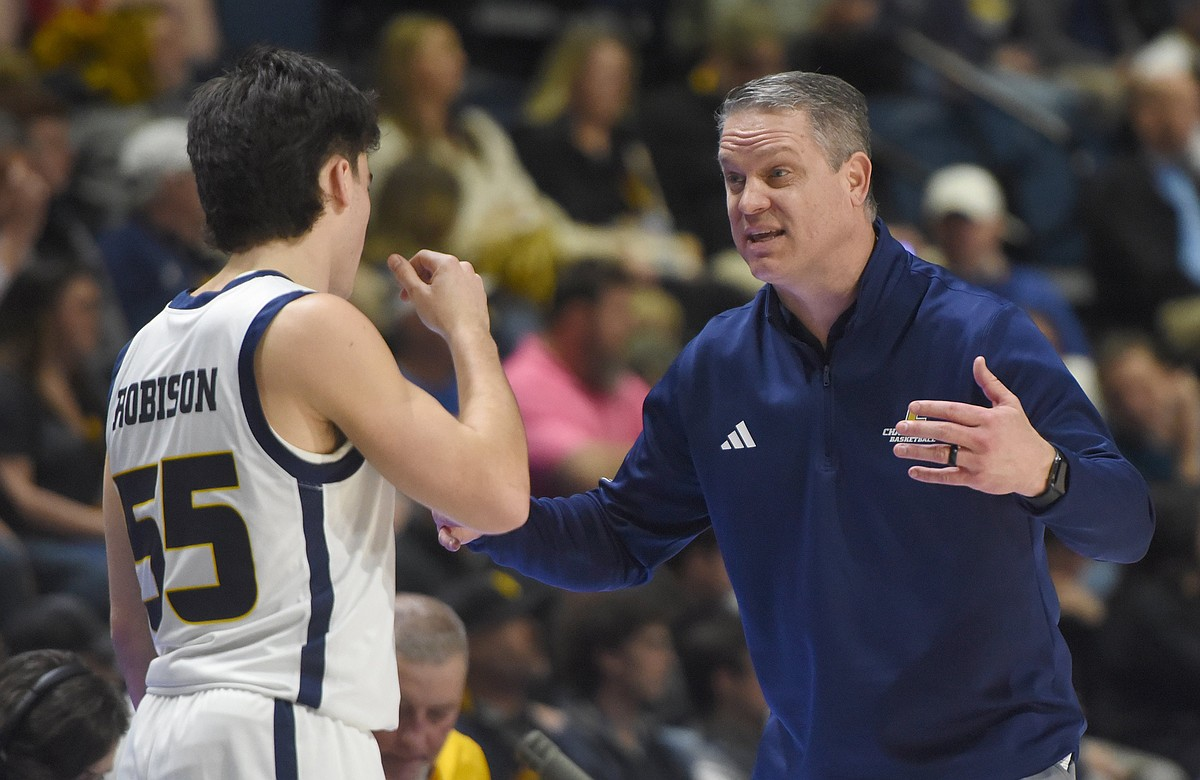

Chattanooga Mocs
- Title: Head coach
- League: Southern Conference

Personal information
- Born: December 10, 1974 (age 51)
- Listed height: 6 ft 3 in (1.91 m)
- Listed weight: 195 lb (88 kg)

Career information
- High school: Shawnee (Medford, New Jersey)
- College: Penn State (1993–1999)
- NBA draft: 1999: undrafted
- Playing career: 1999–2002
- Position: Point guard
- Number: 10
- Coaching career: 2006–present

Career history

Playing
- 2001–2002: Roanoke Dazzle

Coaching
- 2006–2011: Penn State (assistant)
- 2011–2015: Navy (associate HC)
- 2015–2022: VMI
- 2022–present: Chattanooga

Career highlights
- As player: All-Big Ten (1996); Fourth-team Parade All-American (1993); USA Today New Jersey Player of the Year (1993); As coach: NIT champion (2025); SoCon regular season champion (2025); 2× SoCon Coach of the Year (2021, 2025)

Milan Daniel Earl (born December 10, 1974) is an American college basketball coach who is currently head coach for Chattanooga Mocs men's basketball. He is originally from Medford Lakes, New Jersey and attended Shawnee High School in Medford, graduating in 1993. He was a 1993 Parade All-American and was named 1993 USA Today New Jersey Player of the Year in high school. He was named 2nd team All-Big Ten as a junior for the Penn State Nittany Lions before losing two seasons to injury. He completed his eligibility for the team in 1999 and led Penn State basketball in assists four seasons.

He is the older brother of William & Mary Tribe head coach Brian Earl.

== Playing career ==
=== High school ===
During his high school basketball career he was named a Parade All-American. The Shawnee basketball team had a combined 59–3 record during Earl's junior and senior years. In 1991–92, his junior year, Shawnee was the New Jersey Group IV state champion, ranked #1 in New Jersey and #9 in the entire United States. In 1992–93 they were the South Jersey champion and was ranked #7 nationally. Earl was named the USA Today New Jersey Player of the Year in 1993 and his 2,006 career points total ranked him as first in scoring passing Darrin severs 1,996 points of Medford vo-tech Burlington County's all-time leading scorer at the time of his graduation.

=== College ===
Earl accepted a scholarship to Penn State University where he was the starting point guard on the basketball team all four years. He is one of Penn State's all-time leaders in scoring and assists, and he was named to the All-Big Ten Conference second team by the media and third team by the coaches in 1996. He had an injury plagued college career that saw him redshirt twice and spend six years in the program. Earl led Penn State in assists four times. The 1995–96 Nittany Lions team started the season with a 19–2 record and was ranked #9 in the country at one point during the season.

=== Professional ===
Dan Earl played professionally in Germany, Poland, and Portugal. He also spent time in the Continental Basketball Association as well as the NBA Development League. He got close to making a National Basketball Association team, where in the 2001–02 and 2002–03 seasons he spent time with the New Jersey Nets during their training camps.

== Coaching career ==
In 2006, Earl joined his alma mater as an assistant coach. He spent six seasons with the team until 2011, at which time he became the associate head coach at the United States Naval Academy.

In April 2015, Earl was hired as head coach at VMI, replacing Duggar Baucom.

On March 30, 2022, Earl accepted the head coaching position at Chattanooga, replacing Lamont Paris.

Finding immediate success in his first year, he achieved an 18-17 record, with solid wins coming against Murray State and Middle Tennessee Blue Raiders. Overachieving by reaching the Southern Conference Tournament Finals and losing to Furman Paladins.

Following an improve 2023-2024 Chattanooga season that saw them reach the second round of the Southern Conference Tournament and improve to 21-12, Earl reloaded his roster and headed into 202-2025 Chattanooga season with high expectations.

On April 3, 2025, Earl capped a historic season at Chattanooga by going 29-9 (tied for most in school history) and winning the National Invitation Tournament (NIT) in overtime over the UC Irvine Anteaters.

== Personal ==
Earl and his wife, Sheila, were married in the summer of 2008 and have two daughters, Mila and Alyssa. His brother Brian is also an accomplished basketball player and is currently head coach at William & Mary.

== Head coaching record ==
Record table
Season	Team	Overall	Conference	Standing	Postseason
VMI Keydets (Southern Conference) (2015–2022)
2015–16	VMI	9–21	4–14	T–8th	
2016–17	VMI	6–24	3–15	10th	
2017–18	VMI	9–21	4–14	9th	
2018–19	VMI	11–21	4–14	T–8th	
2019–20	VMI	9–24	3–15	9th	
2020–21	VMI	13–12	7–7	6th	
2021–22	VMI	16–16	9–9	T–5th	CBI First Round
VMI:		73–139 (.344)	34–88 (.279)		
Chattanooga Mocs (Southern Conference) (2022–present)
2022–23	Chattanooga	18–17	7–11	7th	
2023–24	Chattanooga	21–12	12–6	T–2nd	
2024–25	Chattanooga	29–9	15–3	1st	NIT Champions
2025–26	Chattanooga	13–19	7–11	T–8th	
2026–27	Chattanooga	0–0	0–0		
Chattanooga:		81–57 (.587)	41–31 (.569)		
Total:		154–196 (.440)			
National champion Postseason invitational champion Conference regular season champion Conference regular season and conference tournament champion Division regular season champion Division regular season and conference tournament champion Conference tournament champion
