= Brooks Savage =

American basketball coach (born 1985)

Current position
- Title: Head coach
- Team: East Tennessee State
- Conference: Southern
- Record: 61–40 (.604)

Biographical details
- Born: September 12, 1985 (age 41); Columbia, South Carolina, U.S.
- Education: University of Tennessee (2008)

Coaching career (HC unless noted)
- 2008–2010: Tennessee (GA)
- 2011–2012: Northwest Florida State (assistant)
- 2012–2013: Presbyterian (assistant)
- 2014–2015: Chattanooga (assistant)
- 2015–2020: East Tennessee State (assistant)
- 2020–2023: Wake Forest (assistant)
- 2023–present: East Tennessee State

Administrative career (AD unless noted)
- 2010–2011: Tulane (dir. of player development)
- 2013–2014: Chattanooga (basketball ops.)

Head coaching record
- Overall: 61–40 (.604)

Accomplishments and honors

Championships
- SoCon regular season (2026)

Awards
- SoCon Coach of the Year (2026)

Brooks T. Savage (born September 12, 1985) is an American men's college basketball head coach for the East Tennessee State Buccaneers.

== Early life ==
Born in Columbia, South Carolina, Savage played basketball for the Irmo High School Yellow Jackets under coach Tim Whipple.

In college, Savage was a student manager for the University of Tennessee under then head coaches, Buzz Peterson and Bruce Pearl. After completing his undergraduate degree in 2008, Savage became a graduate assistant under Bruce Pearl until 2010. Savage earned his bachelor's and master's degrees in sports management during his time in Knoxville.

== Coaching career ==
In 2011, Savage began his coaching career as an assistant coach with one year stints at Northwest Florida State and Presbyterian. Following his time at Presbyterian, he became the director of basketball operations at Chattanooga in 2013. In 2014, he was promoted to assistant coach.

Savage served as an assistant coach at East Tennessee State from 2015 to 2020 under head coach Steve Forbes. During that five year tenure at ETSU, the Buccaneers compiled an overall record of 130–43, including two Southern Conference Tournament titles. In May 2020, Savage joined the Wake Forest basketball staff. From 2021 to 2023, Savage saw Wake Forest compile at least 10 ACC wins, resulting in the first time the Demon Deacons had back-to-back 10-plus conference wins since 1996–97.

On March 20, 2023, Savage was hired as the head men's basketball coach at East Tennessee State University.

== Personal life ==
Savage is married to his wife, Lauren. The couple have two children, Waverly and Sloane.

== Head coaching record ==
Record table
Season	Team	Overall	Conference	Standing	Postseason
East Tennessee State Buccaneers (Southern Conference) (2023–present)
2023–24	East Tennessee State	19–16	8–10	T–7th	
2024–25	East Tennessee State	19–13	12–6	T–3rd	
2025–26	East Tennessee State	23–11	13–5	1st	
East Tennessee State:		61–40 (.604)	33–21 (.611)		
Total:		61–40 (.604)			
National champion Postseason invitational champion Conference regular season champion Conference regular season and conference tournament champion Division regular season champion Division regular season and conference tournament champion Conference tournament champion
