= Bucky McMillan =

American basketball coach

Current position
- Title: Head coach
- Team: Texas A&M
- Conference: SEC
- Record: 28–12 (.700)

Biographical details
- Born: August 12, 1983 (age 43); Birmingham, Alabama, U.S.

Playing career
- 2002–2006: Birmingham–Southern

Coaching career (HC unless noted)
- 2006–2008: Mountain Brook HS (assistant)
- 2008–2020: Mountain Brook HS
- 2020–2025: Samford
- 2025–present: Texas A&M

Head coaching record
- Overall: 127–64 (.665) (college); 332–74 (.818) (high school)
- Tournaments: 1–2 (NCAA Division I); 0–1 (NIT)

Accomplishments and honors

Championships
- SoCon tournament (2024); 2 SoCon regular season (2023, 2024)

Awards
- NHSCA Coach of the Year (2018); 3× SoCon Coach of the Year (2022–2024)

Henry Ward "Bucky" McMillan III (born August 12, 1983) is an American basketball coach who is currently the head coach at Texas A&M University.

== Early life and education ==
McMillan played basketball at Mountain Brook High School in Mountain Brook, Alabama and led them to a state final four in 2001. He played college basketball for Birmingham-Southern from 2002 to 2006. McMillan was named to the league All-Academic team as a senior, and he graduated from Birmingham-Southern in 2007 with a degree in education services.

== Coaching career ==
While in college, McMillan coached youth teams in Mountain Brook, and became the junior varsity head coach in 2006. McMillan was hired as the head coach at Mountain Brook in 2008. In his first season, the team finished 18-12. He won three 7A basketball championships, two 6A basketball championships for Mountain Brook. He coached the Spartans to two championship runner-ups, seven final four appearances, 10 regional appearances and nine area titles.

in 2018, McMillan was named the national Boys Basketball Coach of the Year by the National High School Coaches Association after the team finished 34-3. He's the first Alabama coach to win the national honor from the NHSCA. McMillan was named the coach of the 2019 Alabama-Mississippi All-Star Game. He was the USA Today's Alabama Coach of the Year in 2019. In 2020, Mountain Brook was ranked 13th in the top 25 public high school basketball programs in the United States over the previous ten years. He finished 333-74 in twelve seasons at Mountain Brook, averaging nearly 28 wins per season.

On April 6, 2020, McMillan was hired as head coach at Samford, replacing Scott Padgett. His former coach at Birmingham Southern, Duane Reboul, came out of retirement to join McMillan's staff as a special assistant at Samford. McMillan drew attention for his uptempo and aggressive style of play, nicknamed "Bucky Ball", and his team posted a 96–83 upset at Belmont on December 5, 2020. In his first season, Samford finished 6-13 overall and 2-9 in the Southern Conference, and had eight games canceled due to COVID-19 precautions. In 2022, McMillan was named Southern Conference Coach of the Year by the media.

On April 5, 2025, Texas A&M announced the hiring of McMillan as their head men's basketball coach. In his first season with the team, McMillan led the Aggies to a 4th-place finish in the SEC and an appearance in the NCAA Division I Tournament. McMillan won his first March Madness game as a head coach with Texas A&M beating Saint Mary's 63-50 in the Round of 64.

== Head coaching record ==
Record table
Season	Team	Overall	Conference	Standing	Postseason
Samford Bulldogs (Southern Conference) (2020–2025)
2020–21	Samford	6–13	2–9	10th	
2021–22	Samford	21–11	10–8	T–3rd	
2022–23	Samford	21–11	15–3	T–1st	
2023–24	Samford	29–6	15–3	1st	NCAA Division I Round of 64
2024–25	Samford	22–11	12–6	T–3rd	NIT First Round
Samford:		99–52 (.656)	54–29 (.651)		
Texas A&M Aggies (Southeastern Conference) (2025–present)
2025–26	Texas A&M	22–12	11–7	T–4th	NCAA Division I Round of 32
2026–27	Texas A&M	6–0	0–0		
Texas A&M:		28–12 (.700)	11–7 (.611)		
Total:		127–64 (.665)			
National champion Postseason invitational champion Conference regular season champion Conference regular season and conference tournament champion Division regular season champion Division regular season and conference tournament champion Conference tournament champion
