= 2024–25 Wofford Terriers men's basketball team =

American college basketball season

2024–25 Wofford Terriers men's basketball

SoCon tournament champions

NCAA tournament, First Round
- Conference: Southern Conference
- Record: 19–16 (10–8 SoCon)
- Head coach: Dwight Perry (2nd season)
- Associate head coach: Will Murphy
- Assistant coaches: Tysor Anderson; Drew Gibson; Nate Williams
- Home arena: Jerry Richardson Indoor Stadium

2024–25 Southern Conference men's basketball standings
	Conf.				Overall
Team	W		L	PCT	W		L	PCT
Chattanooga	15	–	3	.833	29	–	9	.763
UNC Greensboro	13	–	5	.722	20	–	12	.625
East Tennessee State	12	–	6	.667	19	–	13	.594
Samford	12	–	6	.667	22	–	11	.667
Furman	11	–	7	.611	25	–	10	.714
Wofford †	10	–	8	.556	19	–	16	.543
VMI	7	–	11	.389	15	–	19	.441
Mercer	6	–	12	.333	14	–	19	.424
Western Carolina	4	–	14	.222	8	–	22	.267
The Citadel	0	–	18	.000	5	–	25	.167
† 2025 SoCon tournament winner

The 2024–25 Wofford Terriers men's basketball team represented Wofford College during the 2024–25 NCAA Division I men's basketball season. The Terriers, led by second-year head coach Dwight Perry, played their home games at Jerry Richardson Indoor Stadium in Spartanburg, South Carolina as a member of the Southern Conference.

== Previous season ==
The Terriers finished the 2023–24 season 17–15, 10–8 in SoCon play to finish in a tie for fifth place. As the #6 seed they fell to #3 seed Chattanooga in the quarterfinals.

== Roster ==
2024–25 Wofford Terriers men's basketball team
Players
Coaches

Pos.	#	Name	Height	Weight	Year	Hometown
G	0	Jackson Sivills	6 ft 6 in (1.98 m)	207 lb (94 kg)	Sr	Paducah, Kentucky
G	1	Chase Cormier	6 ft 2 in (1.88 m)	173 lb (78 kg)	Jr	Atlanta, Georgia
G	2	Dillon Bailey	6 ft 3 in (1.91 m)	185 lb (84 kg)	Sr	Bentonville, Arkansas
G	4	Luke Flynn	6 ft 1 in (1.85 m)	185 lb (84 kg)	Fr	Marietta, Georgia
G	5	Justin Bailey	6 ft 3 in (1.91 m)	185 lb (84 kg)	Jr	Taylors, South Carolina
F	7	Cannon Richards	6 ft 7 in (2.01 m)	205 lb (93 kg)	Fr	Atlanta, Georgia
G	10	Corey Tripp	6 ft 3 in (1.91 m)	195 lb (88 kg)	Sr	Medina, Ohio
G	11	Kahmare Holmes	6 ft 3 in (1.91 m)	205 lb (93 kg)	Fr	Charlotte, North Carolina
C	14	Kyler Filewich	6 ft 9 in (2.06 m)	250 lb (113 kg)	Sr	Winnipeg, Manitoba
F	24	Belal El Shakery	6 ft 8 in (2.03 m)	230 lb (104 kg)	So	Alexandria, Egypt
G	30	Anthony Arrington Jr.	6 ft 2 in (1.88 m)	190 lb (86 kg)	Jr	Atlanta, Georgia
F	32	Jeremy Lorenz	6 ft 8 in (2.03 m)	220 lb (100 kg)	So	Brillion, Wisconsin
F	34	Don Douglass	6 ft 10 in (2.08 m)	215 lb (98 kg)	So	Spartanburg, South Carolina

Head coach

- Dwight Perry (Kentucky)

Assistant coach(es)

- Will Murphy (Wake Forest)
- Tysor Anderson (Georgia Tech)
- Drew Gibson (Wofford)

Legend

- (C) Team captain
- (S) Suspended
- (I) Ineligible
- (W) Walk-on
- Injured
- Current redshirt

Roster
Last update: August 9, 2024

== Schedule and results ==
Date time, TV	Rank^{#}	Opponent^{#}	Result	Record	High points	High rebounds	High assists	Site (attendance) city, state
Non-conference regular season
November 4, 2024*; 5:00 p.m.		Erskine	W 112–58	1–0	16 – Tied	12 – El Shakery	8 – Arrington Jr.	Jerry Richardson Indoor Stadium (1,048); Spartanburg, SC
November 9, 2024*; 4:00 p.m., ESPN+		at Lipscomb	L 69–78	1–1	17 – D. Bailey	12 – Filewich	5 – Filewich	Allen Arena (2,315); Nashville, TN
November 13, 2024*; 7:00 p.m., ESPN+		at Presbyterian	L 68–71	1–2	15 – Tripp	10 – Filewich	6 – Tripp	Templeton Physical Education Center (552); Clinton, SC
November 16, 2024*; 12:00 p.m., ACCN		at No. 6 Duke	L 35–86	1–3	12 – Tied	9 – Filewich	4 – Filewich	Cameron Indoor Stadium (9,314); Durham, NC
November 22, 2024*; 5:00 p.m.		vs. St. Thomas; Cream City Challenge	W 81–73	2–3	18 – J. Bailey	10 – Filewich	4 – Filewich	UWM Panther Arena (1,342); Milwaukee, WI
November 23, 2024*; 4:00 p.m., ESPN+		at Milwaukee; Cream City Challenge	L 74–76	2–4	18 – Tied	7 – J. Bailey	3 – Tied	UWM Panther Arena (1,756); Milwaukee, WI
November 24, 2024*; 12:00 p.m.		vs. Portland State; Cream City Challenge	L 74–79	2–5	20 – D. Bailey	6 – Filewich	5 – Tied	UWM Panther Arena (1,011); Milwaukee, WI
December 1, 2024*; 4:00 p.m., ESPN+		North Alabama	W 74–54	3–5	18 – D. Bailey	9 – Tied	3 – J. Bailey	Jerry Richardson Indoor Stadium (856); Spartanburg, SC
December 4, 2024*; 7:00 p.m., ESPN+		Gardner–Webb	W 88–64	4–5	16 – Lorenz	9 – Filewich	5 – Tied	Jerry Richardson Indoor Stadium (929); Spartanburg, SC
December 7, 2024*; 7:00 p.m., FloSports		at Elon	L 56–79	4–6	12 – Tripp	8 – Filewich	6 – Lorenz	Schar Center; Elon, NC
December 16, 2024*; 7:0 p.m., FloSports		at Charleston	L 67–77	4–7	13 – J. Bailey	16 – Filewich	3 – Tied	TD Arena (4,748); Charleston, SC
December 18, 2024*; 8:00 p.m., ESPN+		at Saint Louis	W 74–71	5–7	24 – Tripp	11 – Filewich	5 – Tripp	Chaifetz Arena (3,679); St. Louis, MO
December 28, 2024*; 2:00 p.m., ESPN+		Kentucky Christian	W 100–55	6–7	20 – Lorenz	15 – Filewich	6 – Filewich	Jerry Richardson Indoor Stadium (874); Spartanburg, SC
SoCon regular season
January 1, 2025; 12:00 p.m., CBSSN		UNC Greensboro	L 66–68	6–8 (0–1)	17 – Tripp	14 – Filewich	5 – Tied	Jerry Richardson Indoor Stadium (918); Spartanburg, SC
January 4, 2025; 4:00 p.m., ESPN+		at East Tennessee State	W 81–78	7–8 (1–1)	18 – D. Bailey	8 – Filewich	5 – Tripp	Freedom Hall Civic Center; Johnson City, TN
January 8, 2025; 7:00 p.m., ESPN+		Western Carolina	W 77–69	8–8 (2–1)	17 – Tied	18 – Filewich	6 – Filewich	Jerry Richardson Indoor Stadium (1,036); Spartanburg, SC
January 13, 2025; 7:00 p.m., ESPN+		at Furman	W 81–62	9–8 (3–1)	19 – D. Bailey	12 – Filewich	6 – Filewich	Timmons Arena (4,367); Greenville, SC
January 15, 2025; 7:00 p.m., ESPN+		at Chattanooga	L 81–83 ^{OT}	9–9 (3–2)	22 – J. Bailey	7 – Lorenz	4 – Lorenz	McKenzie Arena (3,131); Chattanooga, TN
January 18, 2025; 6:00 p.m., ESPN+		Mercer	W 69–49	10–9 (4–2)	18 – J. Bailey	10 – Flynn	3 – Sivills	Jerry Richardson Indoor Stadium (1,925); Spartanburg, SC
January 22, 2025; 7:00 p.m., ESPN+		The Citadel	W 79–68	11–9 (5–2)	19 – Sivills	7 – D. Bailey	6 – Lorenz	Jerry Richardson Indoor Stadium (1,180); Spartanburg, SC
January 25, 2025; 5:00 p.m., ESPN+		at Samford	L 61–77	11–10 (5–3)	15 – Tripp	8 – Filewich	3 – Tied	Pete Hanna Center (3,317); Homewood, AL
January 29, 2025; 7:00 p.m., ESPN+		VMI	L 67–74	11–11 (5–4)	18 – Filewich	11 – Filewich	5 – J. Bailey	Jerry Richardson Indoor Stadium (1,167); Spartanburg, SC
February 1, 2025; 6:00 p.m., ESPN+		at UNC Greensboro	W 74–62	12–11 (6–4)	18 – Tripp	7 – J. Bailey	3 – Tied	First Horizon Coliseum (1,202); Greensboro, NC
February 5, 2025; 7:00 p.m., ESPNU		Chattanooga	L 70–79	12–12 (6–5)	20 – Tripp	8 – Lorenz	3 – Tripp	Jerry Richardson Indoor Stadium (1,254); Spartanburg, SC
February 8, 2025; 2:00 p.m., ESPN+		at Mercer	W 77–66	13–12 (7–5)	19 – Tripp	7 – Filewich	4 – Tripp	Hawkins Arena; Macon, GA
February 12, 2025; 7:00 p.m., ESPN+		at The Citadel	W 74–71 ^{OT}	14–12 (8–5)	20 – Tripp	8 – Filewich	4 – Tripp	McAlister Field House (1,559); Charleston, SC
February 15, 2025; 2:00 p.m., ESPN+		Samford	L 68–76	14–13 (8–6)	18 – Filewich	9 – Filewich	3 – Tied	Jerry Richardson Indoor Stadium (1,533); Spartanburg, SC
February 19, 2025; 6:00 p.m., ESPN+		at VMI	W 82–43	15–13 (9–6)	18 – Filewich	11 – Filewich	5 – Tied	Cameron Hall (1,204); Lexington, VA
February 22, 2025; 2:00 p.m., ESPN+		East Tennessee State	L 68–73	15–14 (9–7)	31 – Tripp	9 – Filewich	4 – Tripp	Jerry Richardson Indoor Stadium (1,787); Spartanburg, SC
February 26, 2025; 7:00 p.m., ESPN+		at Western Carolina	W 90–67	16–14 (10–7)	18 – J. Bailey	11 – Filewich	5 – Filewich	Ramsey Center (2,322); Cullowhee, NC
March 1, 2025; 2:00 p.m., ESPN+		Furman	L 75-78	16–15 (10–8)	16 – Tied	11 – Filewich	3 – Tied	Jerry Richardson Indoor Stadium (2,147); Spartanburg, SC
SoCon tournament
March 8, 2025; 6:00 pm, ESPN+	(6)	vs. (3) East Tennessee State; Quarterfinals	W 72–60	17–15	17 – Sivills	10 – Filewich	3 – Tied	Harrah's Cherokee Center; Asheville, NC
March 8, 2025; 6:00 pm, ESPN+	(6)	vs. (7) VMI; Semifinals	W 85–65	18–15	20 – Tripp	8 – Filewich	3 – Filewich	Harrah's Cherokee Center (4,960); Asheville, NC
March 10, 2025; 7:00 pm, ESPN	(6)	vs. (5) Furman; Championship	W 92–85	19–15	20 – Sivills	7 – J. Bailey	8 – Tripp	Harrah's Cherokee Center; Asheville, NC
NCAA tournament
March 20, 2025*; 6:50 pm, TNT	(15 MW)	vs. (2 MW) No. 6 Tennessee; First Round	L 62–77	19–16	15 – Sivills	5 – Tied	3 – Tied	Rupp Arena; Lexington, KY
*Non-conference game. ^{#}Rankings from AP Poll. (#) Tournament seedings in parentheses. MW=Midwest. All times are in Eastern.
