= 2024–25 VMI Keydets basketball team =

American college basketball season

2024–25 VMI Keydets basketball
- Conference: Southern Conference
- Record: 15–19 (7–11 SoCon)
- Head coach: Andrew Wilson (3rd season)
- Associate head coach: Xavier Silas
- Assistant coaches: Paul Harrison; Austin Kenon; Perin Foote; Caanan Gassmann
- Home arena: Cameron Hall

2024–25 Southern Conference men's basketball standings
	Conf.				Overall
Team	W		L	PCT	W		L	PCT
Chattanooga	15	–	3	.833	29	–	9	.763
UNC Greensboro	13	–	5	.722	20	–	12	.625
East Tennessee State	12	–	6	.667	19	–	13	.594
Samford	12	–	6	.667	22	–	11	.667
Furman	11	–	7	.611	25	–	10	.714
Wofford †	10	–	8	.556	19	–	16	.543
VMI	7	–	11	.389	15	–	19	.441
Mercer	6	–	12	.333	14	–	19	.424
Western Carolina	4	–	14	.222	8	–	22	.267
The Citadel	0	–	18	.000	5	–	25	.167
† 2025 SoCon tournament winner

The 2024–25 VMI Keydets basketball team represented the Virginia Military Institute during the 2024–25 NCAA Division I men's basketball season. The Keydets, led by third-year head coach Andrew Wilson, played their home games at Cameron Hall in Lexington, Virginia as members of the Southern Conference (SoCon).

== Previous season ==
The Keydets finished the 2023–24 season 4–28, 1–17 in SoCon play, to finish in last place. In the first round of the SoCon tournament, they were defeated by East Tennessee State.

== Roster ==
2024–25 VMI Keydets men's basketball team
Players
Coaches

Pos.	#	Name	Height	Weight	Year	Hometown
F	0	Cal Liston	6 ft 5 in (1.96 m)	206 lb (93 kg)	Fr	Marietta, GA
G	1	Rickey Jr. Bradley	6 ft 2 in (1.88 m)	185 lb (84 kg)	Jr	Milwaukee, WI
G	3	Jaren Morton	6 ft 5 in (1.96 m)	185 lb (84 kg)	So	Burlington, NJ
G	4	Linus Holmström	6 ft 3 in (1.91 m)	180 lb (82 kg)	Fr	Stockholm, Sweden
G	5	AJ Clark	6 ft 4 in (1.93 m)	180 lb (82 kg)	So	Suffolk, VA
F	6	Kaden Stuckey	6 ft 8 in (2.03 m)	227 lb (103 kg)	Fr	Mono, ON
G	10	Jaylen Pazon	6 ft 5 in (1.96 m)	190 lb (86 kg)	Fr	New Orleans, LA
F	11	Augustinas Kiudulas	6 ft 8 in (2.03 m)	215 lb (98 kg)	So	Vilnius, Lithuania
G	14	Walker Andrews	6 ft 1 in (1.85 m)	170 lb (77 kg)	RS Fr	Fincastle, VA
G	15	Cooper Sisco	6 ft 5 in (1.96 m)	185 lb (84 kg)	Sr	Frisco, TX
F	22	Cyprian Hyde	6 ft 11 in (2.11 m)	235 lb (107 kg)	So	Oceanside, CA
G	23	Maurice Jr. Wright	6 ft 2 in (1.88 m)	165 lb (75 kg)	So	Palmdale, CA
G	30	Tan Yildizoglu	6 ft 4 in (1.93 m)	187 lb (85 kg)	So	Istanbul, Turkey
F	32	Robert Peters	6 ft 8 in (2.03 m)	205 lb (93 kg)	So	West Allis, WI
F	44	TJ Johnson	6 ft 6 in (1.98 m)	203 lb (92 kg)	So	Belton, TX

Head coach

- Andrew Wilson (Florida State)

Assistant coach(es)

- Xavier Silas (Northern Illinois)
- Paul Harrison (Washington and Lee)
- Austin Kenon (VMI)
- Perin Foote (Florida State)
- Caanan Gassmann (Central Florida)

Legend

- (C) Team captain
- (S) Suspended
- (I) Ineligible
- (W) Walk-on
- Injured
- Current redshirt

Roster
Last update: November 13, 2024

== Schedule and results ==
Date time, TV	Rank^{#}	Opponent^{#}	Result	Record	Site (attendance) city, state
Non-conference regular season
November 4, 2024*; 6:00 p.m., ESPN+		Washington (MD)	W 103–54	1–0	Cameron Hall (825); Lexington, VA
November 9, 2024*; 3:00 p.m., ESPN+		at Bellarmine; SoCon/ASUN Challenge	W 76–71	2–0	Knights Hall (1,174); Louisville, KY
November 12, 2024*; 7:00 p.m., ESPN+		Christendom	W 102–56	3–0	Cameron Hall (175); Lexington, VA
November 15, 2024*; 3:30 p.m.		vs. Tennessee Tech; Greenbrier Tip-Off River Division semifinals	L 71–72	3–1	Colonial Hall (508); White Sulphur Springs, WV
November 16, 2024*; 12:00 p.m.		vs. Charleston Southern; Greenbrier Tip-Off River Division 3rd-place game	W 80–69	4–1	Colonial Hall (474); White Sulphur Springs, WV
November 18, 2024*; 7:00 p.m., ACCNX/ESPN+		at Pittsburgh; Greenbrier Tip-Off campus game	L 48–93	4–2	Petersen Events Center (6,391); Pittsburgh, PA
November 22, 2024*; 7:00 p.m., ESPN+		at Davidson	L 66–93	4–3	John M. Belk Arena (2,153); Davidson, NC
November 26, 2024*; 7:00 p.m., ESPN+		at Loyola (MD)	L 67–70	4–4	Reitz Arena (428); Baltimore, MD
November 29, 2024*; 2:00 p.m., ESPN+		at George Washington	L 64–77	4–5	Charles E. Smith Center (1,294); Washington, D.C.
December 3, 2024*; 6:00 p.m., ESPN+		Virginia–Lynchburg	W 113–51	5–5	Cameron Hall (643); Lexington, VA
December 7, 2024*; 1:00 p.m., ESPN+		Queens; SoCon/ASUN Challenge	L 78–81	5–6	Cameron Hall (2,354); Lexington, VA
December 12, 2024*; 6:00 p.m., ESPN+		Regent	W 100–61	6–6	Cameron Hall (3,250); Lexington, VA
December 21, 2024*; 6:00 p.m., ESPN+		at Richmond	L 71–78	6–7	Robins Center (5,498); Richmond, VA
SoCon regular season
January 1, 2025; 12:00 p.m., ESPN+		at East Tennessee State	L 69–84	6–8 (0–1)	Freedom Hall Civic Center (3,311); Johnson City, TN
January 4, 2025; 4:30 p.m., ESPN+		Mercer	L 67–70	6–9 (0–2)	Cameron Hall (536); Lexington, VA
January 9, 2025; 8:00 p.m., ESPN+		at Samford	L 68–81	6–10 (0–3)	Pete Hanna Center (733); Homewood, AL
January 12, 2025; 12:00 p.m., ESPN+		at Chattanooga	L 66–91	6–11 (0–4)	McKenzie Arena (2,915); Chattanooga, TN
January 15, 2025; 6:00 p.m., ESPN+		Western Carolina	W 66–50	7–11 (1–4)	Cameron Hall (1,257); Lexington, VA
January 18, 2025; 1:00 p.m., ESPN+		at The Citadel	W 75–70	8–11 (2–4)	McAlister Field House (1,441); Charleston, SC
January 22, 2025; 6:00 p.m., ESPN+		Furman	W 91–82	9–11 (3–4)	Cameron Hall (1,522); Lexington, VA
January 25, 2025; 1:00 p.m., ESPN+		UNC Greensboro	L 57–60	9–12 (3–5)	Cameron Hall (4,000); Lexington, VA
January 29, 2025; 7:00 p.m., ESPN+		at Wofford	W 74–67	10–12 (4–5)	Jerry Richardson Indoor Stadium (1,167); Spartanburg, SC
February 1, 2025; 3:30 p.m., ESPN+		at Western Carolina	W 80–76 ^{OT}	11–12 (5–5)	Ramsey Center (2,684); Cullowhee, NC
February 5, 2025; 6:00 p.m., ESPN+		East Tennessee State	L 55–62	11–13 (5–6)	Cameron Hall (2,100); Lexington, VA
February 8, 2025; 1:00 p.m., ESPN+		The Citadel	W 82–70	12–13 (6–6)	Cameron Hall (5,235); Lexington, VA
February 12, 2025; 7:00 p.m., ESPN+		at UNC Greensboro	L 54–80	12–14 (6–7)	First Horizon Coliseum (602); Greensboro, NC
February 15, 2025; 4:30 p.m., ESPN+		at Mercer	W 80–71	13–14 (7–7)	Hawkins Arena (2,261); Macon, GA
February 19, 2025; 6:00 p.m., ESPN+		Wofford	L 43–82	13–15 (7–8)	Cameron Hall (1,204); Lexington, VA
February 22, 2025; 12:00 p.m., ESPN+		at Furman	L 71–75	13–16 (7–9)	Bon Secours Wellness Arena (3,047); Greenville, SC
February 27, 2025; 6:00 p.m., ESPN+		Samford	L 83–95	13–17 (7–10)	Cameron Hall (2,613); Lexington, VA
March 1, 2025; 1:00 p.m., ESPN+		Chattanooga	L 70–91	13–18 (7–11)	Cameron Hall (2,357); Lexington, VA
SoCon tournament
March 7, 2025; 7:30 p.m., ESPN+	(7)	vs. (10) The Citadel; First round	W 73–62	14–18	Harrah's Cherokee Center (2,692); Asheville, NC
March 8, 2025; 2:30 p.m., ESPN+	(7)	vs. (2) UNC Greensboro; Quarterfinals	W 64–57	15–18	Harrah's Cherokee Center (4,127); Asheville, NC
March 9, 2025; 6:30 p.m., ESPNU	(7)	vs. (6) Wofford; Semifinals	L 65–85	15–19	Harrah's Cherokee Center (4,960); Asheville, NC
*Non-conference game. ^{#}Rankings from AP poll. (#) Tournament seedings in parentheses. All times are in Eastern.
