= 2024–25 Furman Paladins men's basketball team =

2024–25 Furman Paladins men's basketball

NIT, First Round
- Conference: Southern Conference
- Record: 25–10 (11–7 SoCon)
- Head coach: Bob Richey (8th season)
- Associate head coach: Chad Warner
- Assistant coaches: Pat Estepp; Khyle Marshall; Kip Owens; Rett Lister
- Home arena: Bon Secours Wellness Arena

2024–25 Southern Conference men's basketball standings
	Conf.				Overall
Team	W		L	PCT	W		L	PCT
Chattanooga	15	–	3	.833	29	–	9	.763
UNC Greensboro	13	–	5	.722	20	–	12	.625
East Tennessee State	12	–	6	.667	19	–	13	.594
Samford	12	–	6	.667	22	–	11	.667
Furman	11	–	7	.611	25	–	10	.714
Wofford †	10	–	8	.556	19	–	16	.543
VMI	7	–	11	.389	15	–	19	.441
Mercer	6	–	12	.333	14	–	19	.424
Western Carolina	4	–	14	.222	8	–	22	.267
The Citadel	0	–	18	.000	5	–	25	.167
† 2025 SoCon tournament winner

The 2024–25 Furman Paladins men's basketball team represented Furman University during the 2024–25 NCAA Division I men's basketball season. The Paladins, led by eighth-year head coach Bob Richey, played their home games at Bon Secours Wellness Arena in Greenville, South Carolina as members of the Southern Conference (SoCon).

== Previous season ==
The Paladins finished the 2023–24 season 17–16, 10–8 in SoCon play, to finish in fifth place. In the SoCon tournament, they defeated Western Carolina in overtime, but lost to Samford in the semifinals.

== Roster ==
2024–25 Furman Paladins men's basketball team
Players
Coaches

Pos.	#	Name	Height	Weight	Year	Hometown
G	0	PJay Jr. Smith	6 ft 0 in (1.83 m)	175 lb (79 kg)	Sr	La Vergne, TN
F	1	Charles Johnston	6 ft 11 in (2.11 m)	225 lb (102 kg)	Jr	Sydney, Australia
G	2	Eddrin Bronson	6 ft 4 in (1.93 m)	184 lb (83 kg)	RS Fr	Tampa, FL
G	3	Tom House	6 ft 7 in (2.01 m)	200 lb (91 kg)	Jr	Dayton, OH
F	4	Ben VanderWal	6 ft 7 in (2.01 m)	210 lb (95 kg)	Jr	Elmhurst, IL
F	5	Mason Smith	6 ft 7 in (2.01 m)	200 lb (91 kg)	RS Fr	Huntersville, NC
F	6	Tyrese Hughey	6 ft 6 in (1.98 m)	220 lb (100 kg)	Sr	Columbus, OH
G	7	Nick Anderson	6 ft 3 in (1.91 m)	170 lb (77 kg)	GS	Schererville, IN
G	10	Tommy Humphries	6 ft 5 in (1.96 m)	215 lb (98 kg)	RS Fr	Minneapolis, MN
F	11	Jayson Morgan	6 ft 8 in (2.03 m)	250 lb (113 kg)	Fr	Glen Allen, VA
F	12	Davis Molnar	6 ft 6 in (1.98 m)	215 lb (98 kg)	RS So	Fayetteville, NC
F	13	Garrett Hien	6 ft 9 in (2.06 m)	220 lb (100 kg)	GS	Concord, NC
F	14	Clyde Mauldin	6 ft 6 in (1.98 m)	200 lb (91 kg)	Fr	Isle of Palms, SC
F	21	Cooper Bowser	6 ft 11 in (2.11 m)	210 lb (95 kg)	So	Woodbridge, VA
F	30	Thomas Tillman	6 ft 6 in (1.98 m)	200 lb (91 kg)	Jr	Charleston, SC

Head coach

- Bob Richey (North Greenville)

Assistant coach(es)

- Chad Warner (Georgia)
- Pat Estepp (Cedarville)
- Khyle Marshall (Butler)
- Kip Owens (Alabama–Huntsville)
- Rett Lister (Furman)

Legend

- (C) Team captain
- (S) Suspended
- (I) Ineligible
- (W) Walk-on
- Injured
- Current redshirt

Roster
Last update: November 25, 2024

== Schedule and results ==
Date time, TV	Rank^{#}	Opponent^{#}	Result	Record	Site (attendance) city, state
Exhibition
October 27, 2024*; 1:00 p.m.		No. 11 Auburn	L 62–83	–	Bon Secours Wellness Arena (4,017); Greenville, SC
Non-conference regular season
November 4, 2024*; 7:00 p.m.		Columbia International	W 104–46	1–0	Bon Secours Wellness Arena (1,517); Greenville, SC
November 8, 2024*; 7:30 p.m., ESPN+		Belmont	W 76–74	2–0	Curb Event Center (2,194); Nashville, TN
November 11, 2024*; 7:00 p.m., ESPN+		Jacksonville	W 78–69	3–0	Bon Secours Wellness Arena (2,007); Greenville, SC
November 15, 2024*; 7:00 p.m., ESPN+		Tulane	W 75–67	4–0	Bon Secours Wellness Arena (2,867); Greenville, SC
November 20, 2024*; 7:00 p.m.		Oglethorpe	W 124–48	5–0	Legacy Early College (836); Greenville, SC
November 23, 2024*; 2:00 p.m., ESPN+		at Charleston Southern	W 67–46	6–0	Buccaneer Field House (784); North Charleston, SC
November 26, 2024*; 11:30 p.m., ESPNU		vs. Seattle; Vegas Showdown	W 61–56	7–0	T-Mobile Arena (14,757); Paradise, NV
November 30, 2024*; 6:00 p.m., ESPN+		at No. 1 Kansas; Vegas Showdown campus game	L 51–86	7–1	Allen Fieldhouse (15,300); Lawrence, KS
December 4, 2024*; 7:00 p.m., ESPN+		at Florida Gulf Coast	W 76–73	8–1	Alico Arena (1,908); Fort Myers, FL
December 7, 2024*; 12:00 p.m., ESPN+		Princeton	W 69–63	9–1	Bon Secours Wellness Arena (3,227); Greenville, SC
December 14, 2024*; 12:00 p.m., ESPN+		South Carolina State	W 68–64	10–1	Bon Secours Wellness Arena (2,374); Greenville, SC
December 18, 2024*; 7:00 p.m.		Montreat	W 100–75	11–1	Davis Field House (897); Greenville, SC
December 21, 2024*; 3:00 p.m., ESPN+		at Harvard	W 77–63	12–1	Lavietes Pavilion (1,187); Boston, MA
Southern Conference regular season
January 1, 2025; 1:00 p.m., ESPN+		at Western Carolina	W 90–61	13–1 (1–0)	Ramsey Center (1,276); Cullowhee, NC
January 4, 2025; 4:00 p.m., ESPN+		at UNC Greensboro	L 67–84	13–2 (1–1)	First Horizon Coliseum (1,006); Greensboro, NC
January 8, 2025; 7:00 p.m., ESPN+		at The Citadel	W 67–63 ^{OT}	14–2 (2–1)	McAlister Field House (1,833); Charleston, SC
January 13, 2025; 7:00 p.m., ESPN+		Wofford	L 62–81	14–3 (2–2)	Bon Secours Wellness Arena (4,367); Greenville, SC
January 15, 2025; 7:00 p.m., ESPN+		East Tennessee State	W 73–70	15–3 (3–2)	Bon Secours Wellness Arena (2,347); Greenville, SC
January 18, 2025; 5:00 p.m., ESPN+		Chattanooga	L 71–75	15–4 (3–3)	Bon Secours Wellness Arena (4,327); Greenville, SC
January 22, 2025; 6:00 p.m., ESPN+		at VMI	L 82–91	15–5 (3–4)	Cameron Hall (1,522); Lexington, VA
January 25, 2025; 4:30 p.m., ESPN+		at Mercer	W 79–74	16–5 (4–4)	Hawkins Arena (3,272); Macon, GA
January 29, 2025; 6:00 p.m., CBSSN		Samford	W 72–70	17–5 (5–4)	Bon Secours Wellness Arena (2,737); Greenville, SC
February 2, 2025; 2:00 p.m., CBSSN		at East Tennessee State	L 69–72	17–6 (5–5)	Freedom Hall Civic Center (5,211); Johnson City, TN
February 5, 2025; 7:00 p.m., ESPN+		Western Carolina	W 84–75 ^{OT}	18–6 (6–5)	Davis Field House (1,807); Greenville, SC
February 8, 2025; 4:30 p.m., ESPN+		at Chattanooga	L 72–85	18–7 (6–6)	McKenzie Arena (3,751); Chattanooga, TN
February 12, 2025; 7:00 p.m., ESPN+		Mercer	W 96–72	19–7 (7–6)	Bon Secours Wellness Arena (1,987); Greenville, SC
February 17, 2025; 2:00 p.m., ESPN+		UNC Greensboro	L 50–58	19–8 (7–7)	Bon Secours Wellness Arena (2,767); Greenville, SC
February 19, 2025; 7:30 p.m., ESPN+		at Samford	W 80–72	20–8 (9–7)	Pete Hanna Center (2,165); Homewood, AL
February 22, 2025; 12:00 p.m., ESPN+		VMI	W 75–71	21–8 (9–7)	Bon Secours Wellness Arena (3,047); Greenville, SC
February 26, 2025; 7:00 p.m., ESPN+		The Citadel	W 85–42	22–8 (10–7)	Bon Secours Wellness Arena (2,137); Greenville, SC
March 1, 2025; 2:00 p.m., ESPN+		at Wofford	W 78-75	23–8 (11–7)	Jerry Richardson Indoor Stadium (2,147); Spartanburg, SC
SoCon tournament
March 8, 2025; 8:30 pm, ESPN+	(5)	vs. (4) Samford; Quarterfinals	W 95–78	24–8	Harrah's Cherokee Center (5,459); Asheville, NC
March 9, 2025; 4:00 pm, ESPN2/ESPNU	(5)	vs. (1) Chattanooga; Semifinals	W 80–77 ^{OT}	25–8	Harrah's Cherokee Center; Asheville, NC
March 10, 2025; 7:00 pm, ESPN	(5)	vs. (6) Wofford; Championship	L 85–92	25–9	Harrah's Cherokee Center (6,332); Asheville, NC
NIT
March 19, 2025; 7:00 p.m., ESPN2		at (2) North Texas; First Round – Dallas Region	L 64–75	25–10	The Super Pit (2,138); Denton, TX
*Non-conference game. ^{#}Rankings from AP poll. (#) Tournament seedings in parentheses. All times are in Eastern.
