= 2024–25 Queens Royals men's basketball team =

American college basketball season

2024–25 Queens Royals men's basketball

CBI, Quarterfinals
- Conference: Atlantic Sun Conference
- Record: 20–15 (11–7 ASUN)
- Head coach: Grant Leonard (3rd season)
- Assistant coaches: Dan Bailey; Bobby Horodyski; JR Reynolds; Adam Short; Kyle Moore
- Home arena: Curry Arena

2024–25 ASUN men's basketball standings
	Conf.				Overall
Team	W		L	PCT	W		L	PCT
Lipscomb †	14	–	4	.778	25	–	10	.714
North Alabama	14	–	4	.778	24	–	11	.686
Florida Gulf Coast	13	–	5	.722	19	–	15	.559
Jacksonville	12	–	6	.667	19	–	14	.576
Eastern Kentucky	12	–	6	.667	18	–	14	.563
Queens*	11	–	7	.611	20	–	15	.571
Austin Peay	8	–	10	.444	14	–	19	.424
North Florida	8	–	10	.444	15	–	17	.469
Stetson	6	–	12	.333	8	–	24	.250
Central Arkansas	4	–	14	.222	9	–	24	.273
West Georgia*	4	–	14	.222	6	–	25	.194
Bellarmine	2	–	16	.111	5	–	26	.161
† 2025 ASUN tournament winner * ineligible for the 2025 NCAA tournament due to transition from Division II

The 2024–25 Queens Royals men's basketball team represented the Queens University of Charlotte during the 2024–25 NCAA Division I men's basketball season. The Royals, led by third-year head coach Grant Leonard, played their home games at Curry Arena located in Charlotte, North Carolina as members of the Atlantic Sun Conference.

This season marked Queens' third year of a four-year transition period from Division II to Division I. As a result, the Royals are not eligible for NCAA postseason play until the 2026–27 season.

== Previous season ==
The Royals finished the 2023–24 season 14–19, 7–9 in ASUN play to finish in eighth place. They defeated Florida Gulf Coast in the first round, before falling to eventual tournament champions Stetson in the quarterfinals of the ASUN tournament.

== Roster ==
2024–25 Queens Royals men's basketball team
Players
Coaches

Pos.	#	Name	Height	Weight	Year	Previous school	Hometown
F	1	Nasir Mann	6 ft 5 in (1.96 m)	192 lb (87 kg)	Jr	McNeese	Gainesville, Florida
G	2	DJ Shine	6 ft 1 in (1.85 m)	—	Fr	Brewster Academy	Augusta, Georgia
G	3	Kalib Mathews	6 ft 4 in (1.93 m)	185 lb (84 kg)	Sr	Henderson Collegiate	Franklinton, North Carolina
C	6	Sawyer Mayhugh	6 ft 10 in (2.08 m)	—	Fr	UMass	Weston, Massachusetts
G	7	Caleb Parr	6 ft 4 in (1.93 m)	—	Jr	Northeast Mississippi CC	Columbus, Mississippi
G	8	Ryan Phelps	6 ft 0 in (1.83 m)	—	So	Staples HS	Westport, Connecticut
G/F	9	Maban Jabriel	6 ft 9 in (2.06 m)	—	Fr	Tri-City Prep	Waterloo, Ontario
G/F	10	Bryce Cash	6 ft 5 in (1.96 m)	210 lb (95 kg)	So	Carmel Christian School	Charlotte, North Carolina
G	11	Chris Ashby	6 ft 2 in (1.88 m)	185 lb (84 kg)	Sr	Paris JC	Houston, Texas
G	15	Jordon Nevill	5 ft 11 in (1.8 m)	170 lb (77 kg)	So	East Mecklenburg HS	Charlotte, North Carolina
G	20	Asjon Anderson	6 ft 2 in (1.88 m)	160 lb (73 kg)	Jr	Ranger College	Tacoma, Washington
F	22	Jaxon Pollard	6 ft 7 in (2.01 m)	225 lb (102 kg)	Sr	Salt Lake CC	Cedar Hills, Utah
F	23	Leo Colimerio	6 ft 7 in (2.01 m)	193 lb (88 kg)	GS	Fresno State	São Paulo, Brazil
F	24	Yoav Berman	6 ft 6 in (1.98 m)	—	Fr	Maccabi Ra'anana	Tel Aviv, Israel
G	25	Jacob Brandly	6 ft 6 in (1.98 m)	—	Fr	Combine Academy	Holtsville, New York
F	32	Malcolm Wilson	7 ft 0 in (2.13 m)	215 lb (98 kg)	GS	Georgetown	Columbia, South Carolina
G	35	Colby Christiansen	6 ft 2 in (1.88 m)	—	Fr	Franklin HS	Portland, Oregon
G	85	Aneek Patil	5 ft 10 in (1.78 m)	145 lb (66 kg)	So	ISA Prep	Foster City, California

Head coach

- Grant Leonard (William Penn)

Assistant coach(es)

- Dan Bailey (Queens (NC))
- Bobby Horodyski (Central Florida)
- JR Reynolds (Virginia)
- Adam Short (Avila)
- Kyle Moore (Tusculum)

Legend

- (C) Team captain
- (S) Suspended
- (I) Ineligible
- (W) Walk-on
- Injured
- Current redshirt

Roster
Last update: October 21, 2024

== Schedule and results ==
Date time, TV	Rank^{#}	Opponent^{#}	Result	Record	Site (attendance) city, state
Exhibition
October 29, 2024*; 7:00 p.m.		Johnson C. Smith	W 94–74	–	Curry Arena; Charlotte, NC
Non-conference regular season
November 4, 2024*; 7:00 p.m., ESPN+		Lynchburg	W 90–39	1–0	Curry Arena (340); Charlotte, NC
November 8, 2024*; 7:00 p.m., ESPN+		Western Carolina; ASUN/SoCon Challenge	W 67–54	2–0	Curry Arena (632); Charlotte, NC
November 12, 2024*; 9:00 p.m., ESPN+		at Utah	L 65–96	2–1	Jon M. Huntsman Center (6,757); Salt Lake City, UT
November 13, 2024*; 9:00 p.m., ESPN+		at BYU	L 55–99	2–2	Marriott Center (16,789); Provo, UT
November 19, 2024*; 6:30 p.m., ESPN+		at Appalachian State	L 53–65	2–3	Holmes Center (2,678); Boone, NC
November 23, 2024*; 6:00 p.m.		vs. USC Upstate; ETSU Tournament	W 98–74	3–3	Freedom Hall Civic Center (317); Johnson City, TN
November 24, 2024*; 5:00 p.m., ESPN+		at East Tennessee State; ETSU Tournament	L 67–82	3–4	Freedom Hall Civic Center (2,347); Johnson City, TN
December 3, 2024*; 7:00 p.m., ESPN+		Winthrop	L 78–86	3–5	Curry Arena (575); Charlotte, NC
December 7, 2024*; 1:00 p.m., ESPN+		at VMI; ASUN/SoCon Challenge	W 81–78	4–5	Cameron Hall (2,354); Lexington, VA
December 10, 2024*; 7:00 p.m., ESPN+		Carolina	W 91–53	5–5	Curry Arena (145); Charlotte, NC
December 14, 2024*; 2:00 p.m., ESPN+		at Gardner–Webb	W 85–83	6–5	Paul Porter Arena (750); Boiling Springs, NC
December 18, 2024*; 7:00 p.m., ESPN+		Mercer	W 73–66	7–5	Curry Arena (512); Charlotte, NC
December 21, 2024*; 7:00 p.m., ESPN+		at No. 17 Ole Miss	L 62–80	7–6	SJB Pavilion; Oxford, MS
ASUN regular season
January 2, 2025; 7:00 p.m., ESPN+		Stetson	W 96–87	8–6 (1–0)	Curry Arena (574); Charlotte, NC
January 4, 2025; 1:00 p.m., ESPN+		Florida Gulf Coast	W 92–83	9–6 (2–0)	Curry Arena (472); Charlotte, NC
January 9, 2025; 8:00 p.m., ESPN+		at Lipscomb	W 75–73	10–6 (3–0)	Allen Arena (1,563); Nashville, TN
January 11, 2025; 5:00 p.m., ESPN+		at Austin Peay	W 67–60	11–6 (4–0)	F&M Bank Arena (1,137); Clarksville, TN
January 16, 2025; 7:00 p.m., ESPN+		at Stetson	W 95–60	12–6 (5–0)	Insight Credit Union Arena (476); DeLand, FL
January 18, 2025; 2:00 p.m., ESPN+		at Florida Gulf Coast	L 47–60	12–7 (5–1)	Alico Arena (2,154); Fort Myers, FL
January 23, 2025; 7:00 p.m., ESPN+		North Florida	L 81–90	12–8 (5–2)	Curry Arena (796); Charlotte, NC
January 25, 2025; 1:00 p.m., ESPN+		Jacksonville	L 77–87	12–9 (5–3)	Curry Arena (864); Charlotte, NC
January 29, 2025; 7:00 p.m., ESPN+		North Alabama	W 75–67	13–9 (6–3)	Curry Arena (596); Charlotte, NC
February 1, 2025; 1:00 p.m., ESPN+		West Georgia	W 87–68	14–9 (7–3)	Curry Arena (415); Charlotte, NC
February 5, 2025; 7:30 p.m., ESPN+		at Central Arkansas	W 63–47	15–9 (8–3)	Farris Center (815); Conway, AR
February 8, 2025; 1:00 p.m., ESPN+		Lipscomb	L 81–94	15–10 (8–4)	Curry Arena (1,075); Charlotte, NC
February 13, 2025; 6:30 p.m., ESPN+		at Bellarmine	W 92–87 ^{OT}	16–10 (9–4)	Knights Hall (1,132); Louisville, KY
February 15, 2025; 4:00 p.m., ESPN+		at Eastern Kentucky	L 80–86 ^{OT}	16–11 (9–5)	Baptist Health Arena (2,216); Richmond, KY
February 18, 2025; 7:00 p.m., ESPN+		Central Arkansas	W 89–72	17–11 (10–5)	Curry Arena (468); Charlotte, NC
February 20, 2025; 7:00 p.m., ESPN+		Austin Peay	L 78–92	17–12 (10–6)	Curry Arena (636); Charlotte, NC
February 24, 2025; 7:00 p.m., ESPN+		at West Georgia	W 72–57	18–12 (11–6)	The Coliseum (523); Carrollton, GA
February 26, 2025; 7:00 p.m., ESPN+		at North Alabama	L 69–74	18–13 (11–7)	CB&S Bank Arena (2,992); Florence, AL
ASUN tournament
March 3, 2025; 7:00 p.m., ESPN+	(6)	at (3) Florida Gulf Coast; Quarterfinals	W 71–65	19–13	Alico Arena (2,423); Fort Myers, FL
March 6, 2025; 8:00 p.m., ESPN+	(6)	at (1) Lipscomb; Semifinals	L 75–81 ^{OT}	19–14	Allen Arena (1,706); Nashville, TN
CBI
March 23, 2025; 4:00 p.m., FloSports		vs. Northern Arizona; First round	W 85–78	20–14	Ocean Center; Daytona Beach, FL
March 24, 2025; 4:00 p.m., FloSports		vs. Cleveland State; Quarterfinals	L 73–88	20–15	Ocean Center (611); Daytona Beach, FL
*Non-conference game. ^{#}Rankings from AP Poll. (#) Tournament seedings in parentheses. All times are in Eastern.
