= 2024–25 UNC Greensboro Spartans men's basketball team =

American college basketball season

2024–25 UNC Greensboro Spartans men's basketball
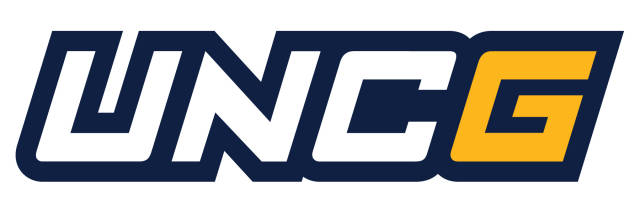
- Conference: Southern Conference
- Record: 20–12 (13–5 SoCon)
- Head coach: Mike Jones (4th season)
- Assistant coaches: Bryant Stith; Brett Gilbert; Josh Gross
- Home arena: First Horizon Coliseum; Fleming Gymnasium

2024–25 Southern Conference men's basketball standings
	Conf.				Overall
Team	W		L	PCT	W		L	PCT
Chattanooga	15	–	3	.833	29	–	9	.763
UNC Greensboro	13	–	5	.722	20	–	12	.625
East Tennessee State	12	–	6	.667	19	–	13	.594
Samford	12	–	6	.667	22	–	11	.667
Furman	11	–	7	.611	25	–	10	.714
Wofford †	10	–	8	.556	19	–	16	.543
VMI	7	–	11	.389	15	–	19	.441
Mercer	6	–	12	.333	14	–	19	.424
Western Carolina	4	–	14	.222	8	–	22	.267
The Citadel	0	–	18	.000	5	–	25	.167
† 2025 SoCon tournament winner

The 2024–25 UNC Greensboro Spartans men's basketball team represented the University of North Carolina at Greensboro during the 2024–25 NCAA Division I men's basketball season. The Spartans, led by fourth-year head coach Mike Jones, played their home games at the First Horizon Coliseum and Fleming Gymnasium in Greensboro, North Carolina as members of the Southern Conference (SoCon).

== Previous season ==
The Spartans finished the 2023–24 NCAA Division I men's basketball season with a record of 21–11, 12–6 in Southern Conference play, to finish in second place. As the No. 3 seed in the SoCon tournament, they lost to East Tennessee State in the quarterfinals.

Guard Kobe Langley was awarded the Southern Conference Defensive Player of the Year and named to the SoCon All-Defensive Team. Mikael Brown-Jones, Keyshaun Langley, and Kobe Langley were named to the All SoCon first, second, and third teams respectively.

== Offseason ==
=== Departing players ===
Departing Players
Name	Number	Position	Height	Weight	Year	Hometown	Notes
Keyshaun Langley	0	G	6'1"	175	Graduate Student	High Point, North Carolina	Completed college eligibility
Mikael Brown-Jones	2	F	6'8"	220	Senior	Philadelphia, Pennsylvania	Graduated, transferred to Ole Miss
Kobe Langley	3	G	6'1"	180	Graduate Student	High Point, North Carolina	Completed college eligibility
Jaylon Gibson	11	F	6'9"	225	Junior	Zebulon, North Carolina	Transferred to Charleston Southern
Tim Ceaser	24	F	6'9"	205	Senior	Marion, Arkansas	Graduated
Jevon Johnson	25	F	6'3"	170	Sophomore	Durham, North Carolina	

=== Incoming transfers ===
incoming transfers
Name	Position	Height	Weight	Year	Hometown	Previous school
Clinton Efinda	F	6'6"	220	Sophomore	Naas, Ireland	Ellsworth Community College
Ronald Polite III	G	6'2"	182	Senior	Oxon Hill, Maryland	George Mason
Malik Henry	F	6'8"	195	Senior	Longview, Texas	George Mason
Kenyon Giles	G	5'10"	165	Junior	Chesapeake, Virginia	Radford
Demetrius Davis	F	6'8"	195	Graduate Student	Atlanta, Georgia	Chattanooga

=== 2024 recruiting class ===
College recruiting information
Name	Hometown	School	Height	Weight	Commit date
Isaiah Washington; G	Fayetteville, North Carolina	Winston Salem Christian School	6 ft 5 in (1.96 m)	193 lb (88 kg)	Jun 5, 2024
Isaiah Washington; G	Recruit ratings: 247Sports:				
Overall recruit ranking:
Note: In many cases, Scout, Rivals, 247Sports, On3, and ESPN may conflict in their listings of height and weight.; In these cases, the average was taken. ESPN grades are on a 100-point scale.; Sources: "2022 Team Ranking". Rivals.

== Roster ==
2024–25 UNC Greensboro Spartans men's basketball team
Players
Coaches

Pos.	#	Name	Height	Weight	Year	Hometown
F	0	Demetrius Davis	6 ft 8 in (2.03 m)	195 lb (88 kg)	GS	Atlanta, Georgia (United States)
F	2	Clinton Efinda	6 ft 5 in (1.96 m)	220 lb (100 kg)	So	Naas, Ireland (Republic of Ireland)
G	3	Kenyon Giles	5 ft 9 in (1.75 m)	170 lb (77 kg)	Jr	Chesapeake, Virginia (United States)
G	4	Mason So	6 ft 2 in (1.88 m)	180 lb (82 kg)	So	Arlington, Virginia (United States)
G	7	Clyde Bailey II (W)	6 ft 1 in (1.85 m)	180 lb (82 kg)	Jr	Virginia Beach, Virginia (United States)
G	8	Isaiah Washington	6 ft 5 in (1.96 m)	185 lb (84 kg)	Fr	Fayetteville, North Carolina (United States)
G	11	Ronald Polite III	6 ft 5 in (1.96 m)	187 lb (85 kg)	GS	Oxon Hill, Maryland (United States)
G	12	Donovan Atwell	6 ft 5 in (1.96 m)	187 lb (85 kg)	Jr	Huntersville, North Carolina (United States)
F	13	Miles Jones (W)	6 ft 6 in (1.98 m)	215 lb (98 kg)	GS	Radford, Virginia (United States)
G	14	Keyon Webb (W)	6 ft 2 in (1.88 m)	185 lb (84 kg)	So	Durham, North Carolina (United States)
G	20	Joryam Saizonou	6 ft 3 in (1.91 m)	188 lb (85 kg)	Sr	Almere, Netherlands
F	22	Jalen Breath	6 ft 8 in (2.03 m)	225 lb (102 kg)	RS Jr	Moore, Oklahoma (United States)
F	24	Malik Henry	6 ft 8 in (2.03 m)	230 lb (104 kg)	GS	Longview, Texas (United States)
F	33	Muon Reath	6 ft 7 in (2.01 m)	180 lb (82 kg)	Sr	Ottawa, Ontario (Canada)
F	34	Domas Kauzonas	6 ft 10 in (2.08 m)	240 lb (109 kg)	So	Vilnius, Lithuania
G	35	Akrum Ahemed	6 ft 3 in (1.91 m)	190 lb (86 kg)	GS	Hackensack, New Jersey (United States)

Head coach

- Mike Jones (Howard)

Assistant coach(es)

- Bryant Stith (Virginia)
- Brett Gilbert (Lebanon Valley)
- Josh Gross (UNC Greensboro)

Legend

- (C) Team captain
- (S) Suspended
- (I) Ineligible
- (W) Walk-on
- Injured
- Current redshirt

Roster
Last update: July 30, 2024

== Schedule and results ==
Date time, TV	Rank^{#}	Opponent^{#}	Result	Record	High points	High rebounds	High assists	Site (attendance) city, state
Non-conference regular season
November 4, 2024*; 7:00 p.m., ESPN+		Florida Gulf Coast	W 73-64	1–0	17 – Tied	10 – Breath	3 – Polite III	First Horizon Coliseum (2,252); Greensboro, NC
November 11, 2024*; 8:00 p.m., ACCNX/ESPN+		at SMU	L 68–81	1–1	21 – Giles	10 – Jones	4 – Saizonou	Moody Coliseum (4,930); Dallas, TX
November 16, 2024*; 1:00 p.m., ESPN+		North Carolina Wesleyan	W 99–54	2–1	16 – Ahemed	10 – Jones	4 – Giles	Fleming Gymnasium (692); Greensboro, NC
November 21, 2024*; 6:30 p.m., FS1		at No. 16 Indiana	L 58–69	2–2	17 – Polite III	9 – Breath	4 – Jones	Simon Skjodt Assembly Hall (17,222); Bloomington, IN
November 25, 2024*; 11:00 pm, FloHoops		vs. Long Beach State; Ball Dawgs Classic	W 71–48	3–2	22 – Giles	6 – Henry	8 – Polite III	Lee's Family Forum; Henderson, NV
November 26, 2024*; 11:00 pm, FloHoops		vs. San Jose State; Ball Dawgs Classic	L 64–69	3–3	19 – Polite III	10 – Breath	3 – Tied	Lee's Family Forum; Henderson, NV
November 27, 2024*; 7:30 pm, FloHoops		vs. UTEP; Ball Dawgs Classic	L 58–64	3–4	20 – Atwell	6 – Tied	4 – Polite III	Lee's Family Forum; Henderson, NV
December 3, 2024*; 7:00 pm, ESPN+		High Point	W 72–68	4–4	25 – Giles	10 – Breath	5 – Saizonou	Fleming Gymnasium (1,680); Greensboro, NC
December 7, 2024*; 2:00 pm, FloHoops		at North Carolina A&T; Battle of Market Street	W 67–55	5–4	25 – Giles	10 – Breath	5 – Saizonou	Corbett Sports Center (2,365); Greensboro, NC
December 14, 2024*; 5:00 pm, ESPN+		at North Florida	L 77–89	5–5	27 – Atwell	10 – Jones	5 – Saizonou	UNF Arena (1,349); Jacksonville, FL
December 17, 2024*; 7:00 pm, ESPN+		William Peace	W 86–37	6–5	14 – Atwell	5 – Jones	4 – Tied	Fleming Gymnasium (389); Greensboro, NC
December 21, 2024*; 7:00 pm, FloHoops		at Elon	L 69–73	6–6	24 – Giles	5 – Jones	4 – Jones	Schar Center (1,828); Elon, NC
December 28, 2024*; 4:00 pm, ESPN+		Virginia Lynchburg	W 105–50	7–6	21 – Atwell	7 – Tied	7 – Polite III	Fleming Gymnasium (462); Greensboro, NC
SoCon Regular Season
January 1, 2025; 12:00 pm, CBSSN		at Wofford	W 68–66	8–6 (1–0)	16 – Tied	7 – Atwell	3 – Polite III	Jerry Richardson Indoor Stadium (918); Spartanburg, SC
January 4, 2025; 4:00 pm, ESPN+		Furman	W 84–67	9–6 (2–0)	25 – Giles	5 – Tied	4 – Giles	First Horizon Coliseum (1,006); Greensboro, NC
January 9, 2025; 5:00 p.m., CBSSN		at Chattanooga	W 78–75	10–6 (3–0)	28 – Atwell	5 – Tied	3 – Polite III	McKenzie Arena (2,867); Chattanooga, TN
January 11, 2025; 6:00 pm, ESPN+		at Samford	L 69–76	10–7 (3–1)	19 – Atwell	5 – Henry	5 – Saizonou	Pete Hanna Center (1,789); Homewood, AL
January 15, 2025; 7:00 pm, ESPN+		The Citadel	W 70–57	11–7 (4–1)	19 – Atwell	9 – Davis	10 – Saizonou	First Horizon Coliseum (952); Greensboro, NC
January 18, 2025; 3:00 pm, ESPN+		at Western Carolina	W 83–55	12–7 (5–1)	17 – Atwell	6 – Breath	6 – Polite III	Ramsey Center (2,868); Cullowhee, NC
January 22, 2025; 7:00 pm, ESPN+		Mercer	L 78–79	12–8 (5–2)	20 – Polite III	10 – Davis	5 – Polite III	First Horizon Coliseum (807); Greensboro, NC
January 25, 2025; 1:00 pm, ESPN+		at VMI	W 60–57	13–8 (6–2)	14 – Giles	8 – Jones	3 – Jones	Cameron Hall (4,000); Lexington, VA
January 29, 2025; 7:00 pm, ESPN+		East Tennessee State	W 70–65	14–8 (7–2)	23 – Giles	10 – Breath	3 – Giles	Fleming Gymnasium (1,588); Greensboro, NC
February 1, 2025; 4:00 pm, ESPN+		Wofford	L 62–74	14–9 (7–3)	18 – Polite III	17 – Breath	2 – Tied	First Horizon Coliseum (1,202); Greensboro, NC
February 5, 2025; 7:00 pm, ESPN+		at The Citadel	W 76–61	15–9 (8–3)	22 – Polite III	7 – Polite III	3 – Tied	McAlister Field House (1,431); Charleston, SC
February 8, 2025; 4:00 pm, ESPN+		Western Carolina	W 74–70	16–9 (9–3)	18 – Polite III	11 – Breath	3 – Polite III	First Horizon Coliseum (1,141); Greensboro, NC
February 12, 2025; 7:00 pm, ESPN+		VMI	W 80–54	17–9 (10–3)	17 – Atwell	9 – Atwell	6 – Davis	First Horizon Coliseum (602); Greensboro, NC
February 15, 2025; 2:00 pm, ESPN+		at Furman	W 58–50	18–9 (11–3)	19 – Giles	8 – Breath	5 – Polite III	Timmons Arena (2,767); Greenville, SC
February 19, 2025; 7:00 pm, ESPNU		at East Tennessee State	L 49–65	18–10 (11–4)	13 – Giles	7 – Breath	4 – Polite III	Freedom Hall Civic Center (3,507); Johnson City, TN
February 22, 2025; 2:00 pm, ESPN+		at Mercer	W 78–61	19–10 (12–4)	17 – Atwell	14 – Breath	3 – Saizonou	Hawkins Arena (2,129); Macon, GA
February 27, 2025; 7:00 pm, ESPN+		Chattanooga	L 63–75	19–11 (12–5)	17 – Polite III	9 – Breath	5 – Polite III	First Horizon Coliseum (1,288); Greensboro, NC
March 1, 2025; 4:00 pm, ESPNews		Samford	W 108–100	20–11 (13–5)	25 – Giles	8 – Henry	7 – Polite III	Fleming Gymnasium (1,322); Greensboro, NC
SoCon tournament
March 8, 2025; 2:30 pm, ESPN+	(2)	vs. (7) VMI; Quarterfinals	L 57–64	20–12	18 – Polite III	8 – Breath	2 – Jones	Harrah's Cherokee Center (4,127); Asheville, NC
*Non-conference game. ^{#}Rankings from AP Poll. (#) Tournament seedings in parentheses. All times are in Eastern Time.

== Awards and honors ==
=== SoCon Preseason All Conference Team ===
- Donovan Atwell
