= 2024–25 The Citadel Bulldogs basketball team =

American college basketball season

2024–25 The Citadel Bulldogs basketball
- Conference: Southern Conference
- Record: 5–25 (0–18 SoCon)
- Head coach: Ed Conroy (3rd season, 7th overall)
- Assistant coaches: John Reynolds; Patrick Reilingh; Cameron Wells
- Home arena: McAlister Field House

2024–25 Southern Conference men's basketball standings
	Conf.				Overall
Team	W		L	PCT	W		L	PCT
Chattanooga	15	–	3	.833	29	–	9	.763
UNC Greensboro	13	–	5	.722	20	–	12	.625
East Tennessee State	12	–	6	.667	19	–	13	.594
Samford	12	–	6	.667	22	–	11	.667
Furman	11	–	7	.611	25	–	10	.714
Wofford †	10	–	8	.556	19	–	16	.543
VMI	7	–	11	.389	15	–	19	.441
Mercer	6	–	12	.333	14	–	19	.424
Western Carolina	4	–	14	.222	8	–	22	.267
The Citadel	0	–	18	.000	5	–	25	.167
† 2025 SoCon tournament winner

The 2024–25 The Citadel Bulldogs basketball team represented The Citadel during the 2024–25 NCAA Division I men's basketball season. The Bulldogs were led by head coach Ed Conroy in his third season of his second stint with the team, and his seventh season overall. They played their home games at McAlister Field House in Charleston, South Carolina as members of the Southern Conference (SoCon).

The Bulldogs finished the season 5–25, 0–18 in SoCon play, to finish in tenth (last) place. They lost in the first round of the SoCon tournament to VMI.

== Previous season ==
The Bulldogs finished the 2023–24 season 11–21, 3–15 in SoCon play, to finish in ninth place for the third year in a row. They were defeated by Mercer in the first round of the SoCon tournament for the second year in a row.

== Roster ==
2023–24 The Citadel Bulldogs men's basketball team
Players
Coaches

Pos.	#	Name	Height	Weight	Year	Hometown
G	0	Braylen Smith	5 ft 11 in (1.8 m)	180 lb (82 kg)	Fr	Augusta, GA
F	1	Christian Moore	6 ft 6 in (1.98 m)	230 lb (104 kg)	RS Fr	Los Angeles, CA
G	2	Cameron Glover	6 ft 0 in (1.83 m)	170 lb (77 kg)	Sr	Trussville, AL
F	3	Sola Adebisi	6 ft 6 in (1.98 m)	205 lb (93 kg)	Jr	Alpharetta, GA
G	4	Eze Wali	6 ft 1 in (1.85 m)	180 lb (82 kg)	Fr	Providence, RI
G/F	5	Kam Roberts	6 ft 6 in (1.98 m)	205 lb (93 kg)	So	South Boston, VA
G	7	Paxton Davidson	6 ft 3 in (1.91 m)	205 lb (93 kg)	RS So	Mount Juliet, TN
G/F	10	Brody Fox	6 ft 6 in (1.98 m)	200 lb (91 kg)	Sr	Mahtomedi, MN
F	11	Dante Kearse	6 ft 4 in (1.93 m)	200 lb (91 kg)	Fr	Richmond, VA
G	12	Colby McAllister	6 ft 5 in (1.96 m)	200 lb (91 kg)	Jr	Spanish Fort, AL
G	13	Jack Walter	6 ft 2 in (1.88 m)	190 lb (86 kg)	Fr	Honolulu, HI
F	15	Daniel Burton	6 ft 8 in (2.03 m)	185 lb (84 kg)	Fr	Sumter, SC
G	20	Josh Davis	6 ft 2 in (1.88 m)	180 lb (82 kg)	Jr	Southlake, TX
F	21	Cole Alexander	6 ft 7 in (2.01 m)	220 lb (100 kg)	Jr	Charleston, SC
G	22	Keynan Davis	6 ft 5 in (1.96 m)	205 lb (93 kg)	So	Chicago, IL
F	23	Dominic Commisso	6 ft 8 in (2.03 m)	190 lb (86 kg)	RS Fr	Roscoe, IL
G	24	Rowan Irelan	6 ft 3 in (1.91 m)	195 lb (88 kg)	So	Mount Pleasant, SC
F	25	John Adams	6 ft 8 in (2.03 m)	225 lb (102 kg)	Sr	Douglas, MA
C	30	Graham Eikenberry	6 ft 9 in (2.06 m)	230 lb (104 kg)	Fr	Portland, OR

Head coach

- Ed Conroy (The Citadel)

Assistant coach(es)

- John Reynolds (The Citadel)
- Patrick Reilingh (Louisville)
- Cameron Wells (The Citadel)

Legend

- (C) Team captain
- (S) Suspended
- (I) Ineligible
- (W) Walk-on
- Injured
- Current redshirt

Roster
Last update: August 5, 2024

== Schedule and results ==
Date time, TV	Rank^{#}	Opponent^{#}	Result	Record	Site (attendance) city, state
Exhibition
October 27, 2024*; 2:00 p.m.		Barton	W 85–69	–	McAlister Field House; Charleston, SC
Non-conference regular season
November 4, 2024*; 8:00 p.m., ACCNX		at Boston College	L 60–69	0–1	Silvio O. Conte Forum (4,529); Boston, MA
November 7, 2024*; 7:00 p.m., ESPN+		Erskine	W 86–56	1–1	McAlister Field House (1,103); Charleston, SC
November 11, 2024*; 6:00 p.m., ESPN+		Stetson; SoCon vs ASUN	W 74–52	2–1	McAlister Field House (1,051); Charleston, SC
November 14, 2024*; 7:00 p.m., ESPN+		North Greenville	W 79–54	3–1	McAlister Field House (1,107); Charleston, SC
November 17, 2024*; 2:00 p.m., ESPN+		North Carolina A&T	L 73–82	3–2	McAlister Field House (913); Charleston, SC
November 20, 2024*; 6:00 p.m., ESPN+		Charleston; Rivalry	L 61–76	3–3	McAlister Field House (3,231); Charleston, SC
November 26, 2024*; 7:00 p.m., ESPN+		St. Andrews	W 100–85	4–3	McAlister Field House (855); Charleston, SC
December 3, 2024*; 7:00 p.m., ESPN+		Toccoa Falls	W 94–57	5–3	McAlister Field House (909); Charleston, SC
December 12, 2024*; 7:00 p.m., ESPN+		Campbell	L 58–86	5–4	McAlister Field House (835); Charleston, SC
December 16, 2024*; 7:30 p.m., ESPN+		at Central Arkansas; SoCon vs ASUN	L 71–73	5–5	Farris Center (583); Conway, AR
December 18, 2024*; 8:00 p.m., SECN		at Vanderbilt	L 53–105	5–6	Memorial Gymnasium (6,317); Nashville, TN
SoCon regular season
January 1, 2025; 7:30 p.m., ESPN+		at Samford	L 56–86	5–7 (0–1)	Pete Hanna Center (1,048); Birmingham, AL
January 4, 2025; 1:00 p.m., ESPN+		Chattanooga	L 68–81	5–8 (0–2)	McAlister Field House (1,029); Charleston, SC
January 8, 2025; 7:00 p.m., ESPN+		Furman	L 63–67 ^{OT}	5–9 (0–3)	McAlister Field House (1,833); Charleston, SC
January 11, 2025; 4:00 p.m., ESPN+		at East Tennessee State	L 52–70	5–10 (0–4)	Freedom Hall Civic Center (2,476); Johnson City, TN
January 15, 2025; 7:00 p.m., ESPN+		at UNC Greensboro	L 57–70	5–11 (0–5)	Greensboro Coliseum (952); Greensboro, NC
January 18, 2025; 1:00 p.m., ESPN+		VMI	L 70–75	5–12 (0–6)	McAlister Field House (1,441); Charleston, SC
January 22, 2025; 7:00 p.m., ESPN+		at Wofford	L 68–79	5–13 (0–7)	Jerry Richardson Indoor Stadium (1,180); Spartanburg, SC
January 25, 2025; 1:00 p.m., ESPN+		Western Carolina	L 78–80 ^{OT}	5–14 (0–8)	McAlister Field House (1,315); Charleston, SC
January 29, 2025; 7:00 p.m., ESPN+		at Mercer	L 46–80	5–15 (0–9)	Hawkins Arena (2,752); Macon, GA
February 1, 2025; 1:00 p.m., ESPN+		Samford	L 58–83	5–16 (0–10)	McAlister Field House (957); Charleston, SC
February 5, 2025; 7:00 p.m., ESPN+		UNC Greensboro	L 61–76	5–17 (0–11)	McAlister Field House (1,431); Charleston, SC
February 8, 2025; 1:00 p.m., ESPN+		at VMI	L 70–82	5–18 (0–12)	Cameron Hall (5,235); Lexington, VA
February 12, 2025; 7:00 p.m., ESPN+		Wofford	L 71–74 ^{OT}	5–19 (0–13)	McAlister Field House (1,559); Charleston, SC
February 15, 2025; 3:30 p.m., ESPN+		at Western Carolina	L 73–76	5–20 (0–14)	Ramsey Center (3,728); Cullowhee, NC
February 19, 2025; 7:00 p.m., ESPN+		Mercer	L 52–62	5–21 (0–15)	McAlister Field House (1,443); Charleston, SC
February 22, 2025; 2:00 p.m., ESPN+		at Chattanooga	L 75–76	5–22 (0–16)	McKenzie Arena (4,148); Chattanooga, TN
February 26, 2025; 7:00 p.m., ESPN+		at Furman	L 42–85	5–23 (0–17)	Timmons Arena (2,137); Greenville, SC
March 1, 2025; 1:00 p.m., ESPN+		East Tennessee State	L 66–81	5–24 (0–18)	McAlister Field House (1,237); Charleston, SC
SoCon tournament
March 7, 2025; 7:30 p.m., ESPN+	(10)	vs. (7) VMI; First round	L 62–73	5–25	Harrah's Cherokee Center; Asheville, NC
*Non-conference game. ^{#}Rankings from AP poll. (#) Tournament seedings in parentheses. All times are in Eastern.
