= 2024–25 Chattanooga Mocs men's basketball team =

American college basketball season

2024–25 Chattanooga Mocs men's basketball

SoCon regular season champions

NIT champions
- Conference: Southern Conference
- Record: 29–9 (15–3 SoCon)
- Head coach: Dan Earl (3rd season)
- Assistant coaches: Ander Galfsky; Scott Greenman; Ricardo Rush Jr.
- Home arena: McKenzie Arena

2024–25 Southern Conference men's basketball standings
	Conf.				Overall
Team	W		L	PCT	W		L	PCT
Chattanooga	15	–	3	.833	29	–	9	.763
UNC Greensboro	13	–	5	.722	20	–	12	.625
East Tennessee State	12	–	6	.667	19	–	13	.594
Samford	12	–	6	.667	22	–	11	.667
Furman	11	–	7	.611	25	–	10	.714
Wofford †	10	–	8	.556	19	–	16	.543
VMI	7	–	11	.389	15	–	19	.441
Mercer	6	–	12	.333	14	–	19	.424
Western Carolina	4	–	14	.222	8	–	22	.267
The Citadel	0	–	18	.000	5	–	25	.167
† 2025 SoCon tournament winner

The 2024–25 Chattanooga Mocs men's basketball team represented the University of Tennessee at Chattanooga during the 2024–25 NCAA Division I men's basketball season. The Mocs, led by third-year head coach Dan Earl, played their home games at McKenzie Arena in Chattanooga, Tennessee as a member of the Southern Conference (SoCon). The Mocs finished the season 29–9, 15–3 in SoCon play to win the conference's regular season championship. In the SoCon tournament, they defeated Mercer in the first round, before losing to Furman in the semifinals. The team received an automatic bid to the National Invitation Tournament where they defeated Middle Tennessee, Dayton, Bradley, and Loyola to advance to the championship game. In the championship game, they defeated UC Irvine in overtime to win the NIT championship.

== Previous season ==
The Mocs finished the 2023–24 season 21–12, 12–6 in SoCon play, to finish in third place. As the third seed in the SoCon tournament, they defeated sixth seed Wofford in the quarterfinals, but lost to seventh seed East Tennessee State in the semifinals.

== Roster ==
2024–25 Chattanooga Mocs men's basketball team
Players
Coaches

Pos.	#	Name	Height	Weight	Year	Hometown
G	0	Noah Melson	6 ft 6 in (1.98 m)	175 lb (79 kg)	So	Douglasville, GA
G	1	Ryan Lopez	5 ft 8 in (1.73 m)	175 lb (79 kg)	So	Ooltewah, TN
G	2	Trey Bonham	6 ft 0 in (1.83 m)	175 lb (79 kg)	Sr	Mobile, AL
G	3	Honor Huff	5 ft 10 in (1.78 m)	168 lb (76 kg)	Jr	Brooklyn, NY
F	5	Frank Champion	6 ft 7 in (2.01 m)	220 lb (100 kg)	Sr	Lithonia, GA
G/F	7	Sean Cusano	6 ft 9 in (2.06 m)	215 lb (98 kg)	So	Hilton Head, SC
G	11	Jack Kostel	6 ft 2 in (1.88 m)	185 lb (84 kg)	Sr	Dacula, GA
G	13	Houston Holland	6 ft 3 in (1.91 m)	195 lb (88 kg)	Fr	Chattanooga, TN
G/F	20	Liam Vitters	6 ft 5 in (1.96 m)	220 lb (100 kg)	Fr	Arlington, Virginia
F	21	Collin Mulholland	6 ft 10 in (2.08 m)	218 lb (99 kg)	RS Fr	Kitchener, ON
G	22	Bash Wieland	6 ft 6 in (1.98 m)	215 lb (98 kg)	GS	Cincinnati, OH
F	23	Latif Diouf	6 ft 9 in (2.06 m)	240 lb (109 kg)	Fr	Gouda, Netherlands
G/F	24	Garrison Keeslar	6 ft 7 in (2.01 m)	205 lb (93 kg)	Sr	Green, OH
F	34	Makai Richards	6 ft 10 in (2.08 m)	225 lb (102 kg)	RS Jr	Oak Park, CA
G/F	35	Isaiah Otyaluk	6 ft 7 in (2.01 m)	175 lb (79 kg)	Fr	Cary, NC
G	55	Parker Robison	6 ft 0 in (1.83 m)	175 lb (79 kg)	Fr	Chattanooga, TN

Head coach

- Dan Earl (Penn State)

Assistant coach(es)

- Ander Galfsky (Birmingham–Southern)
- Scott Greenman (Princeton)
- Ricardo Rush Jr. (Maryland)

Legend

- (C) Team captain
- (S) Suspended
- (I) Ineligible
- (W) Walk-on
- Injured
- Current redshirt

Roster
Last update: October 28, 2024

== Schedule and results ==
Date time, TV	Rank^{#}	Opponent^{#}	Result	Record	Site (attendance) city, state
Non-conference regular season
November 4, 2024*; 10:00 p.m., BTN		at USC	L 51–77	0–1	Galen Center (3,294); Los Angeles, CA
November 7, 2024*; 10:00 p.m., ESPN+		at Saint Mary's	L 74–86	0–2	University Credit Union Pavilion (3,188); Moraga, CA
November 11, 2024*; 8:00 p.m., ESPN+		at Austin Peay; SoCon/ASUN Challenge	L 61–67	0–3	F&M Bank Arena (2,655); Clarksville, TN
November 14, 2024*; 8:00 p.m., ESPN+		Morehead State	W 76–62	1–3	McKenzie Arena (2,867); Chattanooga, TN
November 17, 2024*; 3:00 p.m., ESPN+		at Southeast Missouri State	W 87–82	2–3	Show Me Center (580); Cape Girardeau, MO
November 21, 2024*; 7:00 p.m., ESPN+		Johnson (Tennessee)	W 72–52	3–3	McKenzie Arena (2,766); Chattanooga, TN
November 25, 2024*; 7:00 p.m., ESPN+		Tennessee State; Coke Classic	W 85–78	4–3	McKenzie Arena (3,002); Chattanooga, TN
November 27, 2024*; 2:00 p.m., ESPN+		Bryant; Coke Classic	W 84–76	5–3	McKenzie Arena (2,712); Chattanooga, TN
December 3, 2024*; 7:00 p.m., ESPN+		Lipscomb; SoCon/ASUN Challenge	L 62–80	5–4	McKenzie Arena (2,761); Chattanooga, TN
December 12, 2024*; 8:00 p.m., ESPN+		at Evansville	W 75–67	6–4	Ford Center (3,862); Evansville, IN
December 15, 2024*; 2:00 p.m., ESPN+		Alabama A&M	W 85–63	7–4	McKenzie Arena (2,926); Chattanooga, TN
December 18, 2024*; 7:00 p.m., ESPN+		Tennessee Wesleyan	W 99–52	8–4	McKenzie Arena (2,488); Chattanooga, TN
December 21, 2024*; 12:00 p.m., BTN		at Indiana	L 65–74	8–5	Simon Skjodt Assembly Hall (13,574); Bloomington, IN
SoCon regular season
January 1, 2025; 3:00 p.m., ESPN+		at Mercer	L 94–99 ^{OT}	8–6 (0–1)	Hawkins Arena (1,007); Macon, GA
January 4, 2025; 1:00 p.m., ESPN+		at The Citadel	W 81–68	9–6 (1–1)	McAlister Field House (1,029); Charleston, SC
January 9, 2025; 5:00 p.m., CBSSN		UNC Greensboro	L 75–78	9–7 (1–2)	McKenzie Arena (2,867); Chattanooga, TN
January 12, 2025; 12:00 p.m., ESPN+		VMI	W 91–66	10–7 (2–2)	McKenzie Arena (2,915); Chattanooga, TN
January 15, 2025; 7:00 p.m., ESPN+		Wofford	W 83–81 ^{OT}	11–7 (3–2)	McKenzie Arena (3,131); Chattanooga, TN
January 18, 2025; 5:00 p.m., ESPN+		at Furman	W 75–71	12–7 (4–2)	Timmons Arena (4,327); Greenville, SC
January 23, 2025; 7:00 p.m., ESPNU		Samford; Academic Night	L 69–73	12–8 (4–3)	McKenzie Arena (3,679); Chattanooga, TN
January 25, 2025; 4:00 p.m., ESPN+		at East Tennessee State	W 71–63	13–8 (5–3)	Freedom Hall Civic Center (5,015); Johnson City, TN
January 29, 2025; 7:00 p.m., ESPN+		at Western Carolina	W 84–60	14–8 (6–3)	Ramsey Center (1,888); Cullowhee, NC
February 1, 2025; 2:00 p.m., ESPN+		Mercer	W 93–84	15–8 (7–3)	McKenzie Arena (3,551); Chattanooga, TN
February 5, 2025; 7:00 p.m., ESPNU		at Wofford	W 79–70	16–8 (8–3)	Jerry Richardson Indoor Stadium (1,254); Spartanburg, SC
February 8, 2025; 4:30 p.m., ESPN+		Furman	W 85–72	17–8 (9–3)	McKenzie Arena (3,751); Chattanooga, TN
February 12, 2025; 7:30 p.m., ESPN+		at Samford	W 82–68	18–8 (10–3)	Pete Hanna Center (2,311); Homewood, AL
February 15, 2025; 7:00 p.m., ESPN+		East Tennessee State	W 78–71	19–8 (11–3)	McKenzie Arena (4,406); Chattanooga, TN
February 19, 2025; 7:00 p.m., ESPN+		Western Carolina	W 91–86	20–8 (12–3)	McKenzie Arena (3,639); Chattanooga, TN
February 22, 2025; 2:00 p.m., ESPN+		The Citadel	W 76–75	21–8 (13–3)	McKenzie Arena (4,148); Chattanooga, TN
February 27, 2025; 7:00 p.m., ESPN+		at UNC Greensboro	W 75–63	22–8 (14–3)	First Horizon Coliseum (1,288); Greensboro, NC
March 1, 2025; 1:00 p.m., ESPN+		at VMI	W 91–70	23–8 (15–3)	Cameron Hall (2,357); Lexington, VA
SoCon tournament
March 8, 2025; 12:00 p.m., ESPN+	(1)	vs. (8) Mercer; Quarterfinals	W 76–61	24–8	Harrah's Cherokee Center; Asheville, NC
March 9, 2025; 4:00 p.m., ESPNU	(1)	vs. (5) Furman; Semifinals	L 77–80 ^{OT}	24–9	Harrah's Cherokee Center; Asheville, NC
NIT
March 18, 2025*; 8:00 p.m., ESPN+		at (4) Middle Tennessee; First round – Dayton Region	W 109–103 ^{3OT}	25–9	Murphy Center (3,505); Murfreesboro, TN
March 22, 2025*; 11:30 a.m., ESPN2		(1) Dayton; Second round – Dayton Region	W 87–72	26–9	McKenzie Arena (2,633); Chattanooga, TN
March 25, 2025*; 7:00 p.m., ESPN2		at (3) Bradley; Quarterfinals – Dayton Region	W 67–65	27–9	Carver Arena (4,954); Peoria, IL
April 1, 2025*; 9:30 p.m., ESPN2		vs. Loyola Chicago; Semifinals	W 80–73	28–9	Hinkle Fieldhouse (3,288); Indianapolis, IN
April 3, 2025*; 9:00 p.m., ESPN		vs. (1) UC Irvine; Championship	W 85–84 ^{OT}	29–9	Hinkle Fieldhouse (2,825); Indianapolis, IN
*Non-conference game. ^{#}Rankings from AP poll. (#) Tournament seedings in parentheses. All times are in Eastern.
