= 2024–25 East Tennessee State Buccaneers men's basketball team =

American college basketball season

2024–25 East Tennessee State Buccaneers men's basketball
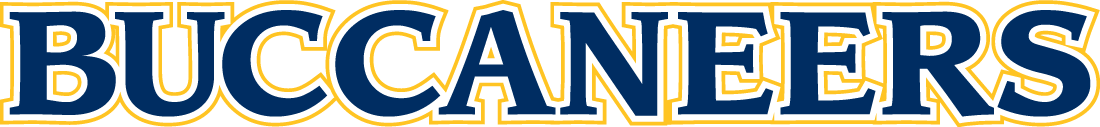
- Conference: Southern Conference
- Record: 19–13 (12–6 SoCon)
- Head coach: Brooks Savage (2nd season)
- Assistant coaches: Kris Arkenberg; Marcus Belcher; Brian Jones; Cory Dixon
- Home arena: Freedom Hall Civic Center

2024–25 Southern Conference men's basketball standings
	Conf.				Overall
Team	W		L	PCT	W		L	PCT
Chattanooga	15	–	3	.833	29	–	9	.763
UNC Greensboro	13	–	5	.722	20	–	12	.625
East Tennessee State	12	–	6	.667	19	–	13	.594
Samford	12	–	6	.667	22	–	11	.667
Furman	11	–	7	.611	25	–	10	.714
Wofford †	10	–	8	.556	19	–	16	.543
VMI	7	–	11	.389	15	–	19	.441
Mercer	6	–	12	.333	14	–	19	.424
Western Carolina	4	–	14	.222	8	–	22	.267
The Citadel	0	–	18	.000	5	–	25	.167
† 2025 SoCon tournament winner

The 2024–25 East Tennessee State Buccaneers men's basketball team represented East Tennessee State University in the 2024–25 NCAA Division I men's basketball season. The Buccaneers, led by second-year head coach Brooks Savage, played their home games at the Freedom Hall Civic Center in Johnson City, Tennessee, as members of the Southern Conference.

== Previous season ==
The Buccaneers finished the season 19–16, 8–10 in SoCon play to finish in a tie for seventh place. They defeated VMI, UNC Greensboro, and Chattanooga to advance to the championship game of the SoCon tournament where they lost to Samford.

== Offseason ==
=== Departing players ===
Departing Players
Name	Number	Position	Height	Weight	Year	Hometown	Reason for Departure
Tyler Rice	3	G	6'1"	180	Junior	Columbia, South Carolina	Transferred to Hampton
Justice Smith	12	G	6'6"	215	RS Junior	Lyons, New York	Transferred to Niagara
Ebby Asamoah	14	G	6'5"	200	Graduate Student	Rockville, Maryland	Completed College Eligibility
Braden Ilic	23	F	6'9"	225	Sophomore	Morristown, Tennessee	Transferred to Carson–Newman
Jadyn Parker	24	F	6'10"	200	RS Junior	Shallotte, North Carolina	Graduated

=== Incoming transfers ===
Incoming transfers
Name	Number	Position	Height	Weight	Year	Hometown	Previous School
Curt Lewis	4	G	6'5"	215	Graduate Student	Louisville, KY	Missouri
John Buggs III	7	G	6'3"	185	Graduate Student	Homer, LA	North Texas
Davion Bradford	8	F/C	7'0"	270	Senior	St. Louis, MO	Wake Forest
Roosevelt Wheeler	12	F/C	6'11"	245	Senior	Richmond, VA	VCU

=== 2024 recruiting class ===
College recruiting information
Name	Hometown	School	Height	Weight	Commit date
Brandon Crawford; F	Irmo, South Carolina	Overtime Elite	6 ft 9 in (2.06 m)	215 lb (98 kg)	May 8, 2024
Brandon Crawford; F	Recruit ratings: Scout: Rivals: 247Sports: ESPN:				
Overall recruit ranking:
Note: In many cases, Scout, Rivals, 247Sports, On3, and ESPN may conflict in their listings of height and weight.; In these cases, the average was taken. ESPN grades are on a 100-point scale.; Sources: "2024 Team Ranking". Rivals.

== Roster ==
2024–25 East Tennessee State Buccaneers men's basketball team
Players
Coaches

Pos.	#	Name	Height	Weight	Year	Hometown
F	0	Karon Boyd	6 ft 5 in (1.96 m)	218 lb (99 kg)	Jr	Concord, North Carolina
G	1	Quimari Peterson	6 ft 1 in (1.85 m)	190 lb (86 kg)	Sr	Gary, Indiana
G	2	Maki Johnson	6 ft 4 in (1.93 m)	186 lb (84 kg)	So	Huntington, West Virginia
G	3	Timmy Fasehun (W)	6 ft 0 in (1.83 m)	175 lb (79 kg)	Jr	Livingston, New Jersey
G	4	Curt Lewis	6 ft 5 in (1.96 m)	234 lb (106 kg)	GS	Louisville, Kentucky
G	5	Allen Strothers	6 ft 1 in (1.85 m)	172 lb (78 kg)	RS Jr	Newport News, Virginia
G	7	John Buggs III	6 ft 3 in (1.91 m)	189 lb (86 kg)	GS	Homer, Louisiana
F/C	8	Davion Bradford	7 ft 0 in (2.13 m)	265 lb (120 kg)	Sr	St. Louis, Missouri
F	10	DJ Hughes	6 ft 6 in (1.98 m)	242 lb (110 kg)	Sr	Indianapolis, Indiana
C	11	David Meriweather	6 ft 10 in (2.08 m)	255 lb (116 kg)	RS Fr	Indianapolis, Indiana
F/C	12	Roosevelt Wheeler	6 ft 11 in (2.11 m)	237 lb (108 kg)	Sr	Richmond, Virginia
G	15	Jaxson Jones (W)	6 ft 4 in (1.93 m)	182 lb (83 kg)	RS Fr	Council Bluffs, Iowa
G	21	Gabe Sisk	6 ft 6 in (1.98 m)	207 lb (94 kg)	So	Louisville, Kentucky
F	22	Jaden Seymour	6 ft 8 in (2.03 m)	211 lb (96 kg)	Sr	Charlotte, North Carolina
F	31	Brandon Crawford	6 ft 9 in (2.06 m)	195 lb (88 kg)	Fr	Irmo, South Carolina

Head coach

- Brooks Savage (Tennessee)

Assistant coach(es)

- Kris Arkenberg (IUPUI)
- Marcus Belcher (Southern Illinois)
- Brian Jones (Northern Iowa)
- Cory Dixon (New Orleans)

Legend

- (C) Team captain
- (S) Suspended
- (I) Ineligible
- (W) Walk-on
- Injured
- Current redshirt

Roster
Last update: September 14, 2024

== Schedule and results ==
Date time, TV	Rank^{#}	Opponent^{#}	Result	Record	Site (attendance) city, state
Exhibition
October 27, 2024*; 4:00 p.m.		High Point	L 56–71		Freedom Hall Civic Center; Johnson City, TN
Non-conference Regular season
November 4, 2024*; 7:00 p.m., ESPN+		Newberry	W 72–51	1–0	Freedom Hall Civic Center (2,109); Johnson City, TN
November 8, 2024*; 7:00 p.m., ESPN+		Eastern Kentucky; SoCon/ASUN Challenge	L 78–82	1–1	Freedom Hall Civic Center (2,435); Johnson City, TN
November 13, 2024*; 7:00 p.m., ESPN+		Tusculum	W 82–54	2–1	Freedom Hall Civic Center (2,078); Johnson City, TN
November 16, 2024*; 5:00 p.m., ESPN+		at Davidson	L 70–76	2–2	John M. Belk Arena (2,490); Davidson, NC
November 22, 2024*; 7:00 p.m., ESPN+		USC Upstate; ETSU MTE	W 87–76	3–2	Freedom Hall Civic Center (2,689); Johnson City, TN
November 24, 2024*; 5:00 p.m., ESPN+		Queens; ETSU MTE	W 82–67	4–2	Freedom Hall Civic Center (2,347); Johnson City, TN
November 27, 2024*; 2:00 p.m., ESPN+		at Charlotte	W 75–55	5–2	Dale F. Halton Arena (2,117); Charlotte, NC
November 30, 2024*; 4:00 p.m., ESPN+		Austin Peay	W 79–57	6–2	Freedom Hall Civic Center (3,467); Johnson City, TN
December 3, 2024*; 7:00 p.m., ESPN+		at James Madison	L 61–71	6–3	Atlantic Union Bank Center (3,364); Harrisonburg, VA
December 7, 2024*; 7:00 p.m., ESPN+		at Wichita State	L 87–96	6–4	Charles Koch Arena (5,602); Wichita, KS
December 14, 2024*; 1:00 p.m., ESPN+		at Jacksonville; SoCon/ASUN Challenge	L 52–60	6–5	Swisher Gymnasium (1,000); Jacksonville, FL
December 18, 2024*; 7:00 p.m., ESPN+		Elon	W 84–58	7–5	Freedom Hall Civic Center (3,177); Johnson City, TN
December 21, 2024*; 3:00 p.m.		at Kansas City	L 66–73	7–6	Swinney Recreation Center (699); Kansas City, MO
SoCon Regular season
January 1, 2025; 12:00 p.m., ESPN+		VMI	W 84–69	8–6 (1–0)	Freedom Hall Civic Center (3,311); Johnson City, TN
January 4, 2025; 4:00 p.m., ESPN+		Wofford	L 78–81	8–7 (1–1)	Freedom Hall Civic Center (4,107); Johnson City, TN
January 8, 2025; 7:00 p.m., ESPN+		at Mercer	W 70–68	9–7 (2–1)	Hawkins Arena (2,217); Macon, GA
January 11, 2025; 4:00 p.m., ESPN+		The Citadel	W 70–52	10–7 (3–1)	Freedom Hall Civic Center (2,476); Johnson City, TN
January 15, 2025; 7:00 p.m., ESPN+		at Furman	L 70–73	10–8 (3–2)	Bon Secours Wellness Arena (2,347); Greenville, SC
January 18, 2025; 6:00 p.m., CBSSN		at Samford	W 65–60	11–8 (4–2)	Pete Hanna Center (4,723); Homewood, AL
January 22, 2025; 7:00 p.m., ESPN+		Western Carolina	W 85–58	12–8 (5–2)	Freedom Hall Civic Center (3,490); Johnson City, TN
January 25, 2025; 4:00 p.m., ESPN+		Chattanooga	L 63–71	12–9 (5–3)	Freedom Hall Civic Center (5,015); Johnson City, TN
January 29, 2025; 7:00 p.m., ESPN+		at UNC Greensboro	L 65–70	12–10 (5–4)	Fleming Gymnasium (1,588); Greensboro, NC
February 2, 2025; 2:00 p.m., CBSSN		Furman	W 72–69	13–10 (6–4)	Freedom Hall Civic Center (5,211); Johnson City, TN
February 5, 2025; 6:00 p.m., ESPN+		at VMI	W 62–55	14–10 (7–4)	Cameron Hall (2,100); Lexington, VA
February 8, 2025; 4:00 p.m., ESPN+		Samford	W 66–59	15–10 (8–4)	Freedom Hall Civic Center (5,472); Johnson City, TN
February 12, 2025; 7:00 p.m., ESPN+		at Western Carolina	L 67–76	15–11 (8–5)	Ramsey Center (1,917); Cullowhee, NC
February 15, 2025; 7:00 p.m., ESPN+		at Chattanooga	L 71–78	15–12 (8–6)	McKenzie Arena (4,406); Chattanooga, TN
February 19, 2025; 7:00 p.m., ESPNU		UNC Greensboro	W 65–49	16–12 (9–6)	Freedom Hall Civic Center (3,507); Johnson City, TN
February 22, 2025; 2:00 p.m., ESPN+		at Wofford	W 73–68	17–12 (10–6)	Jerry Richardson Indoor Stadium (1,787); Spartanburg, SC
February 26, 2025; 7:00 p.m., ESPN+		Mercer	W 59–58	18–12 (11–6)	Freedom Hall Civic Center (4,830); Johnson City, TN
March 1, 2025; 1:00 p.m., ESPN+		at The Citadel	W 81–66	19–12 (12–6)	McAlister Field House (1,237); Charleston, SC
SoCon tournament
March 8, 2025; 6:00 pm, ESPN+	(3)	vs. (6) Wofford; Quarterfinals	L 60–72	19–13	Harrah's Cherokee Center; Asheville, NC
*Non-conference game. ^{#}Rankings from AP poll. (#) Tournament seedings in parentheses. All times are in Eastern.
