= 2024–25 Western Carolina Catamounts men's basketball team =

American college basketball season

2024–25 Western Carolina Catamounts men's basketball
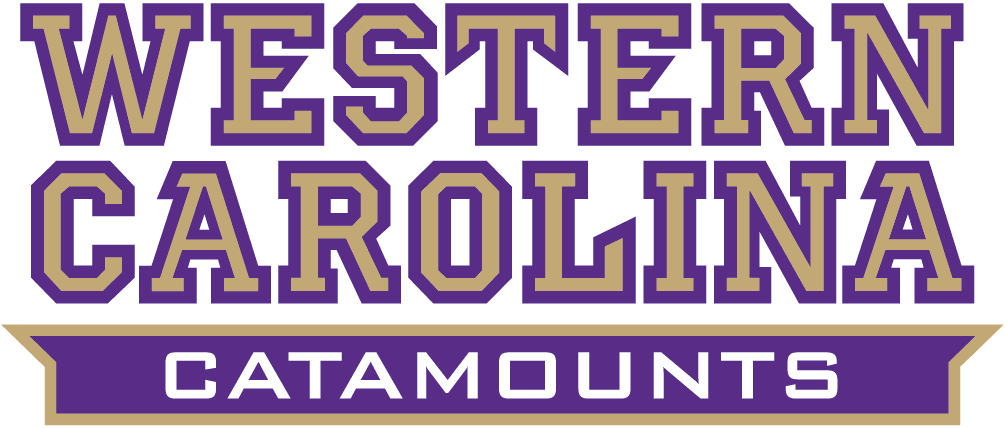
- Conference: Southern Conference
- Record: 8–22 (4–14 SoCon)
- Head coach: Tim Craft (1st season)
- Associate head coach: Andre Gray
- Assistant coaches: Andrew Brown; Adam Bullard; Jackson Simmons
- Home arena: Ramsey Center

2024–25 Southern Conference men's basketball standings
	Conf.				Overall
Team	W		L	PCT	W		L	PCT
Chattanooga	15	–	3	.833	29	–	9	.763
UNC Greensboro	13	–	5	.722	20	–	12	.625
East Tennessee State	12	–	6	.667	19	–	13	.594
Samford	12	–	6	.667	22	–	11	.667
Furman	11	–	7	.611	25	–	10	.714
Wofford †	10	–	8	.556	19	–	16	.543
VMI	7	–	11	.389	15	–	19	.441
Mercer	6	–	12	.333	14	–	19	.424
Western Carolina	4	–	14	.222	8	–	22	.267
The Citadel	0	–	18	.000	5	–	25	.167
† 2025 SoCon tournament winner

The 2024–25 Western Carolina Catamounts men's basketball team represented Western Carolina University during the 2024–25 NCAA Division I men's basketball season. The Catamounts, led by first-year head coach Tim Craft, played their home games at the Ramsey Center located in Cullowhee, North Carolina as members of the Southern Conference (SoCon).

== Previous season ==
The Catamounts finished the 2023–24 season 22–10, 11–7 in SoCon play, to finish in fourth place. They lost in the quarterfinals of the SoCon tournament to Furman.

After their season ended, on March 11, 2024, Justin Gray was named the head coach for Coastal Carolina. Two days later, the school named Gardner–Webb coach Tim Craft the team's new head coach.

== Roster ==
2024–25 Western Carolina Catamounts men's basketball team
Players
Coaches

Pos.	#	Name	Height	Weight	Year	Hometown
G	0	Cord Stansberry	6 ft 4 in (1.93 m)	180 lb (82 kg)	RS So	Bermuda Dunes, CA
F	1	Chase McKey	6 ft 10 in (2.08 m)	202 lb (92 kg)	RS Jr	Atlanta, GA
G	2	CJ Hyland	6 ft 1 in (1.85 m)	175 lb (79 kg)	Fr	Loganville, GA
F	3	Bernard Pelote	6 ft 8 in (2.03 m)	224 lb (102 kg)	Sr	Savannah, GA
G	5	Brandon Morgan	6 ft 4 in (1.93 m)	180 lb (82 kg)	Jr	Greensboro, NC
C	7	Brandon White	6 ft 10 in (2.08 m)	250 lb (113 kg)	RS Fr	Spencer, NC
G	8	Ice Emery	6 ft 0 in (1.83 m)	180 lb (82 kg)	Jr	Appleton, WI
G	9	Jamar Livingston	6 ft 3 in (1.91 m)	190 lb (86 kg)	So	Johnson City, TN
G/F	12	Cinque Lemon	6 ft 7 in (2.01 m)	215 lb (98 kg)	RS So	Spring Lake, NC
G	14	Carson Brown	6 ft 1 in (1.85 m)	180 lb (82 kg)	RS Jr	Miramar Beach, FL
G	17	Max Williams	6 ft 6 in (1.98 m)	180 lb (82 kg)	Fr	Hanover, VA
G	20	Fischer Brown	6 ft 4 in (1.93 m)	180 lb (82 kg)	Fr	Lewistown, MT
F	23	Marcus Kell	6 ft 8 in (2.03 m)	213 lb (97 kg)	RS So	Rock Hill, SC
G	24	Kamari Jones	6 ft 4 in (1.93 m)	177 lb (80 kg)	RS Fr	Indianapolis, IN
F	33	Vernon Collins	6 ft 10 in (2.08 m)	224 lb (102 kg)	Jr	Chocowinity, NC

Head coach

- Tim Craft (Florida)

Assistant coach(es)

- Andre Gray (Methodist)
- Andrew Brown (Mercer)
- Adam Bullard (Western Carolina)
- Jackson Simmons (Charlotte)

Legend

- (C) Team captain
- (S) Suspended
- (I) Ineligible
- (W) Walk-on
- Injured
- Current redshirt

Roster
Last update: December 21, 2024

== Schedule and results ==
Date time, TV	Rank^{#}	Opponent^{#}	Result	Record	Site (attendance) city, state
Non-conference regular season
November 4, 2024*; 7:00 p.m., ESPN+		Bob Jones	W 100–61	1–0	Ramsey Center (1,806); Cullowhee, NC
November 8, 2024*; 7:00 p.m., ESPN+		at Queens	L 54–67	1–1	Curry Arena (632); Charlotte, NC
November 13, 2024*; 7:00 p.m., ESPN+		Truett McConnell	W 99–64	2–1	Ramsey Center (1,448); Cullowhee, NC
November 19, 2024*; 7:00 p.m., ACCN		at Wake Forest	L 69–82	2–2	LJVM Coliseum (8,468); Winston-Salem, NC
November 26, 2024*; 7:00 p.m., ACCNX		at Florida State	L 57–91	2–3	Donald L. Tucker Center (2,589); Tallahassee, FL
November 30, 2024*; 2:00 p.m., FS2		at No. 10 Marquette	L 62–94	2–4	Fiserv Forum (15,442); Milwaukee, WI
December 4, 2024*; 7:00 p.m., ESPN+		Bellarmine	W 86–74	3–4	Ramsey Center (1,812); Cullowhee
December 7, 2024*; 3:00 p.m., ESPN+		USC Upstate	L 68–74	3–5	Ramsey Center (1,409); Cullowhee, NC
December 14, 2024*; 2:00 p.m., ESPN+		at UNC Asheville	L 61–78	3–6	Kimmel Arena (923); Asheville, NC
December 17, 2024*; 7:00 p.m., SECN+/ESPN+		at No. 1 Tennessee	L 36–84	3–7	Thompson-Boling Arena (16,866); Knoxville, TN
December 19, 2024*; 11:30 a.m., ESPN+		Milligan	W 78–69	4–7	Ramsey Center (3,514); Cullowhee, NC
SoCon regular season
January 1, 2025; 1:00 p.m., ESPN+		Furman	L 61–90	4–8 (0–1)	Ramsey Center (1,276); Cullowhee, NC
January 4, 2025; 3:00 p.m., ESPN+		Samford	L 69–88	4–9 (0–2)	Ramsey Center (2,798); Cullowhee, NC
January 8, 2025; 7:00 p.m., ESPN+		at Wofford	L 69–77	4–10 (0–3)	Jerry Richardson Indoor Stadium (1,036); Spartanburg, SC
January 12, 2025; 3:30 p.m., ESPN+		Mercer	W 85–82	5–10 (1–3)	Ramsey Center (1,420); Cullowhee, NC
January 15, 2025; 6:00 p.m., ESPN+		at VMI	L 50–66	5–11 (1–4)	Cameron Hall (1,257); Lexington, VA
January 18, 2025; 3:00 p.m., ESPN+		UNC Greensboro	L 55–83	5–12 (1–5)	Ramsey Center (2,868); Cullowhee, NC
January 22, 2025; 7:00 p.m., ESPN+		at East Tennessee State	L 58–85	5–13 (1–6)	Freedom Hall Civic Center (3,490); Johnson City, TN
January 25, 2025; 1:00 p.m., ESPN+		at The Citadel	W 80–78 ^{OT}	6–13 (2–6)	McAlister Field House (1,315); Charleston, SC
January 29, 2025; 7:00 p.m., ESPN+		Chattanooga	L 60–84	6–14 (2–7)	Ramsey Center (1,888); Cullowhee, NC
February 1, 2025; 3:30 p.m., ESPN+		VMI	L 76–80 ^{OT}	6–15 (2–8)	Ramsey Center (2,684); Cullowhee, NC
February 5, 2025; 7:00 p.m., ESPN+		Furman	L 75–84 ^{OT}	6–16 (2–9)	Bon Secours Wellness Arena (1,807); Greenville, SC
February 8, 2025; 4:00 p.m., ESPN+		at UNC Greensboro	L 70–74	6–17 (2–10)	First Horizon Coliseum (1,141); Greensboro, NC
February 12, 2025; 7:00 p.m., ESPN+		East Tennessee State	W 76–67	7–17 (3–10)	Ramsey Center (1,917); Cullowhee, NC
February 15, 2025; 3:30 p.m., ESPN+		The Citadel	W 76–73	8–17 (4–10)	Ramsey Center (3,728); Cullowhee, NC
February 19, 2025; 7:00 p.m., ESPN+		at Chattanooga	L 86–91	8–18 (4–11)	McKenzie Arena (3,639); Chattanooga, TN
February 22, 2025; 3:00 p.m., ESPN+		at Samford	L 72–93	8–19 (4–12)	Pete Hanna Center (2,306); Homewood, AL
February 26, 2025; 7:00 p.m., ESPN+		Wofford	L 67–90	8–20 (4–13)	Ramsey Center (2,322); Cullowhee, NC
March 1, 2025; 4:30 p.m., ESPN+		at Mercer	L 69–81	8–21 (4–14)	Hawkins Arena (1,975); Macon, GA
SoCon tournament
March 7, 2025; 5:00 p.m., ESPN+	(9)	vs. (8) Mercer; First round	L 66–67	8–22	Harrah's Cherokee Center; Asheville, NC
*Non-conference game. ^{#}Rankings from AP poll. (#) Tournament seedings in parentheses. All times are in Eastern.
