= 2024–25 Mercer Bears men's basketball team =

American college basketball season

2024–25 Mercer Bears men's basketball
- Conference: Southern Conference
- Record: 14–19 (6–12 SoCon)
- Head coach: Ryan Ridder (1st season)
- Assistant coaches: Jonathan Mitchell; Daniel Mondragon; Reed Ridder; Ben Whitherspoon
- Home arena: Hawkins Arena

2024–25 Southern Conference men's basketball standings
	Conf.				Overall
Team	W		L	PCT	W		L	PCT
Chattanooga	15	–	3	.833	29	–	9	.763
UNC Greensboro	13	–	5	.722	20	–	12	.625
East Tennessee State	12	–	6	.667	19	–	13	.594
Samford	12	–	6	.667	22	–	11	.667
Furman	11	–	7	.611	25	–	10	.714
Wofford †	10	–	8	.556	19	–	16	.543
VMI	7	–	11	.389	15	–	19	.441
Mercer	6	–	12	.333	14	–	19	.424
Western Carolina	4	–	14	.222	8	–	22	.267
The Citadel	0	–	18	.000	5	–	25	.167
† 2025 SoCon tournament winner

The 2024–25 Mercer Bears men's basketball team represented Mercer University in the 2024–25 NCAA Division I men's basketball season. The Bears, led by first-year head coach Ryan Ridder, played their home games at Hawkins Arena in Macon, Georgia as a member of the Southern Conference.

== Previous season ==
The Bears finished the 2023–24 season 16–17, 8–10 in SoCon play to finish in eighth place. They defeated The Citadel in the first round of the SoCon tournament, before losing to Samford in the quarterfinals. Following the conclusion of the season, head coach Greg Gary and the school parted ways.

== Roster ==
2023–24 Mercer Bears men's basketball team
Players
Coaches

Pos.	#	Name	Height	Weight	Year	Hometown
G	0	Jah Quinones	6 ft 4 in (1.93 m)	225 lb (102 kg)	Jr	Orlando, FL
G/F	1	Cam Bryant	6 ft 7 in (2.01 m)	205 lb (93 kg)	GS	Camilla, GA
G	2	Jah Nze	6 ft 4 in (1.93 m)	225 lb (102 kg)	Jr	Oviedo, FL
G	3	Tyler Johnson	6 ft 2 in (1.88 m)	180 lb (82 kg)	GS	Athens, GA
G	4	Ahmad Robinson	5 ft 10 in (1.78 m)	175 lb (79 kg)	Sr	West Orange, NJ
F	6	Alex Holt	6 ft 8 in (2.03 m)	220 lb (100 kg)	Sr	Lexington, NC
G	9	Angel Montas Jr.	6 ft 6 in (1.98 m)	225 lb (102 kg)	So	La Romana, DR
C	10	Alex Koch	6 ft 8 in (2.03 m)	200 lb (91 kg)	Fr	Athens, GA
G	11	Brady Shoulders	6 ft 6 in (1.98 m)	200 lb (91 kg)	Fr	Eddyville, KY
F	12	Petras Padegimas	6 ft 8 in (2.03 m)	220 lb (100 kg)	So	Kaunas, Lithuania
F	14	TJ Grant	6 ft 5 in (1.96 m)	210 lb (95 kg)	Jr	Warner Robins, GA
G/F	22	Laurynas Vaistaras	6 ft 7 in (2.01 m)	215 lb (98 kg)	GS	Plungė, Lithuania
G	24	Braeden Carlsen	6 ft 4 in (1.93 m)	200 lb (91 kg)	Fr	Wauconda, IL
F	33	Marcus Overstreet	6 ft 9 in (2.06 m)	220 lb (100 kg)	So	Chicago, IL

Head coach

- Ryan Ridder (Embry–Riddle)

Assistant coach(es)

- Jonathan Mitchell (Rutgers)
- Daniel Mondragon (Embry–Riddle)
- Reed Ridder (Embry–Riddle)
- Ben Witherspoon (Embry–Riddle)

Legend

- (C) Team captain
- (S) Suspended
- (I) Ineligible
- (W) Walk-on
- Injured
- Current redshirt

Roster
Last update: October 17, 2024

== Schedule and results ==
Date time, TV	Rank^{#}	Opponent^{#}	Result	Record	Site (attendance) city, state
Non-conference regular season
November 7, 2024*; 7:00 p.m., ESPN+		Virginia–Lynchburg	W 125–54	1–0	Hawkins Arena (2,053); Macon, GA
November 11, 2024*; 9:00 p.m., FS2		at DePaul	L 64–95	1–1	Wintrust Arena (2,913); Chicago, IL
November 13, 2024*; 7:00 p.m., ESPN+		Trinity Baptist	W 101–43	2–1	Hawkins Arena (1,219); Macon, GA
November 16, 2024*; 4:00 p.m., ESPN+		at South Alabama	L 66–75	2–2	Mitchell Center (1,652); Mobile, AL
November 21, 2024*; 7:00 p.m., SECN+/ESPN+		at South Carolina; Fort Myers Tip-Off campus game	L 72–84	2–3	Colonial Life Arena (11,054); Columbia, SC
November 25, 2024*; 1:30 p.m., PTB Live		vs. Jacksonville; Fort Myers Tip-Off Palms Semifinals	W 90–89 ^{OT}	3–3	Suncoast Credit Union Arena (592); Fort Myers, FL
November 26, 2024*; 1:30 p.m., PTB Live		vs. Miami (OH); Fort Myers Tip-Off Palms Championship	L 72–75	3–4	Suncoast Credit Union Arena (610); Fort Myers, FL
December 4, 2024*; 11:00 a.m., ESPN+		West Georgia	W 86–72	4–4	Hawkins Arena (1,309); Macon, GA
December 8, 2024*; 3:00 p.m., ESPN+		at Stetson	W 89–83 ^{OT}	5–4	Edmunds Center (650); DeLand, FL
December 15, 2024*; 2:00 p.m., ESPN+		Chicago State	W 75–63	6–4	Hawkins Arena (812); Macon, GA
December 18, 2024*; 7:00 p.m., ESPN+		at Queens	L 66–73	6–5	Curry Arena (512); Charlotte, NC
December 21, 2024*; 2:00 p.m., ESPN+		at Winthrop	L 97–102	6–6	Winthrop Coliseum (1,587); Rock Hill, SC
December 28, 2024*; 2:00 p.m., ESPN+		at Georgia State	W 71–68	7–6	GSU Convocation Center (1,710); Atlanta, GA
SoCon regular season
January 1, 2025; 7:00 p.m., ESPN+		Chattanooga	W 99–94 ^{OT}	8–6 (1–0)	Hawkins Arena (1,007); Macon, GA
January 4, 2025; 1:00 p.m., ESPN+		at VMI	W 70–67	9–6 (2–0)	Cameron Hall (536); Lexington, VA
January 8, 2025; 7:00 p.m., ESPN+		East Tennessee State	L 68–70	9–7 (2–1)	Hawkins Arena (2,217); Macon, GA
January 12, 2025; 3:30 p.m., ESPN+		at Western Carolina	L 82–85	9–8 (2–2)	Ramsey Center (1,420); Cullowhee, NC
January 15, 2025; 7:00 p.m., ESPN+		Samford	L 74–75	9–9 (2–3)	Hawkins Arena (2,219); Macon, GA
January 18, 2025; 6:00 p.m., ESPN+		at Wofford	L 49–69	9–10 (2–4)	Jerry Richardson Indoor Stadium (1,925); Spartanburg, SC
January 22, 2025; 7:00 p.m., ESPN+		at UNC Greensboro	W 79–78	10–10 (3–4)	First Horizon Coliseum (807); Greensboro, NC
January 25, 2025; 4:30 p.m., ESPN+		Furman	L 74–79	10–11 (3–5)	Hawkins Arena (3,272); Macon, GA
January 29, 2025; 7:00 p.m., ESPN+		The Citadel	W 80–46	11–11 (4–5)	Hawkins Arena (2,752); Macon, GA
February 1, 2025; 2:00 p.m., ESPN+		at Chattanooga	L 84–93	11–12 (4–6)	McKenzie Arena (3,551); Chattanooga, TN
February 5, 2025; 6:30 p.m., ESPN+		at Samford	L 79–100	11–13 (4–7)	Pete Hanna Center (1,284); Homewood, AL
February 8, 2025; 2:00 p.m., ESPN+		Wofford	L 66–77	11–14 (4–8)	Hawkins Arena; Macon, GA
February 12, 2025; 7:00 p.m., ESPN+		at Furman	L 72–96	11–15 (4–9)	Timmons Arena (1,987); Greenville, SC
February 15, 2025; 4:30 p.m., ESPN+		VMI	L 71–80	11–16 (4–10)	Hawkins Arena (2,261); Macon, GA
February 19, 2025; 7:00 p.m., ESPN+		at The Citadel	W 62–52	12–16 (5–10)	McAlister Field House (1,443); Charleston, SC
February 22, 2025; 2:00 p.m., ESPN+		UNC Greensboro	L 61–78	12–17 (5–11)	Hawkins Arena (2,129); Macon, GA
February 26, 2025; 7:00 p.m., ESPN+		at East Tennessee State	L 58–59	12–18 (5–12)	Freedom Hall Civic Center; Johnson City, TN
March 1, 2025; 4:30 p.m., ESPN+		Western Carolina	W 81–69	13–18 (6–12)	Hawkins Arena (1,975); Macon, GA
SoCon tournament
March 7, 2025; 5:00 p.m., ESPN+	(8)	vs. (9) Western Carolina; First round	W 67–66	14–18	Harrah's Cherokee Center; Asheville, NC
March 8, 2025; 12:00 p.m., ESPN+	(8)	vs. (1) Chattanooga; Quarterfinals	L 61–76	14–19	Harrah's Cherokee Center; Asheville, NC
*Non-conference game. ^{#}Rankings from AP Poll. (#) Tournament seedings in parentheses. All times are in Eastern.
