= 2024–25 Samford Bulldogs men's basketball team =

American college basketball season

2024–25 Samford Bulldogs men's basketball

NIT, First round
- Conference: Southern Conference
- Record: 22–11 (12–6 SoCon)
- Head coach: Bucky McMillan (5th season)
- Assistant coaches: Mitch Cole; Danny Young; Neb Exantus; Lorenzo Jenkins; David Good
- Home arena: Pete Hanna Center

2024–25 Southern Conference men's basketball standings
	Conf.				Overall
Team	W		L	PCT	W		L	PCT
Chattanooga	15	–	3	.833	29	–	9	.763
UNC Greensboro	13	–	5	.722	20	–	12	.625
East Tennessee State	12	–	6	.667	19	–	13	.594
Samford	12	–	6	.667	22	–	11	.667
Furman	11	–	7	.611	25	–	10	.714
Wofford †	10	–	8	.556	19	–	16	.543
VMI	7	–	11	.389	15	–	19	.441
Mercer	6	–	12	.333	14	–	19	.424
Western Carolina	4	–	14	.222	8	–	22	.267
The Citadel	0	–	18	.000	5	–	25	.167
† 2025 SoCon tournament winner

The 2024–25 Samford Bulldogs men's basketball team represented Samford University in the 2024–25 NCAA Division I men's basketball season. The Bulldogs, led by fifth-year head coach Bucky McMillan, played their home games at the Pete Hanna Center in Homewood, Alabama as a member of the Southern Conference (SoCon). They finished the season 22–11, 12–6 in SoCon play to finish a tie for third place. As the No. 4 seed in the SoCon tournament, they lost to Furman in the quarterfinals. They received an at-large bid to the National Invitation Tournament where they lost in the first round to George Mason.

On April 4, 2025, head coach Bucky McMillan left the school to take the head coaching position at Texas A&M. The school named Lipscomb head coach Lennie Acuff the team's new head coach.

== Previous season ==
The Bulldogs finished the 2023–24 season 29–6, 15–3 in SoCon play, to win the regular-season championship. As No. 1 seed in the SoCon tournament, they defeated Mercer, Furman and East Tennessee State to win the conference championship. As a result, they received the conference's automatic bid to the NCAA tournament for the third time in school history and first since 2000. As the No. 13 seed in the Midwest region, they lost to Kansas in the first round.

== Roster ==
2024–25 Samford Bulldogs men's basketball team
Players
Coaches

Pos.	#	Name	Height	Weight	Year	Hometown
G	1	Josh Holloway	6 ft 2 in (1.88 m)	160 lb (73 kg)	So	Memphis, TN
G	2	Lukas Walls	6 ft 5 in (1.96 m)	203 lb (92 kg)	So	Knoxville, TN
G	3	Trey Fort	6 ft 4 in (1.93 m)	200 lb (91 kg)	Sr	Florence, MS
G	4	Isaiah West	6 ft 2 in (1.88 m)	190 lb (86 kg)	So	Springfield, TN
F	5	Collin Holloway	6 ft 6 in (1.98 m)	220 lb (100 kg)	Sr	Baton Rouge, LA
G	7	Paulie Stramaglia	5 ft 11 in (1.8 m)	185 lb (84 kg)	Jr	Mountain Brook, AL
G	8	Zion Wilburn	6 ft 5 in (1.96 m)	190 lb (86 kg)	Fr	Richmond, CA
G	10	Corey Brown	6 ft 4 in (1.93 m)	175 lb (79 kg)	Fr	Fairburn, GA
F	11	Larry Olayinka	6 ft 9 in (2.06 m)	215 lb (98 kg)	So	Los Angeles, CA
G	13	Julian Brown	6 ft 1 in (1.85 m)	190 lb (86 kg)	Jr	Middletown, NY
C	14	Brody Davis	6 ft 10 in (2.08 m)	235 lb (107 kg)	Sr	Madison, AL
F	15	Grayson Walters	6 ft 5 in (1.96 m)	210 lb (95 kg)	GS	Mountain Brook, AL
G	21	Rylan Jones	6 ft 0 in (1.83 m)	175 lb (79 kg)	GS	Logan, UT
G	22	Thomas Kizer	6 ft 0 in (1.83 m)	165 lb (75 kg)	So	Memphis, TN
F	23	Caleb Harrison	6 ft 9 in (2.06 m)	205 lb (93 kg)	Fr	Huntsville, AL
G	24	Brody Boyer	6 ft 4 in (1.93 m)	210 lb (95 kg)	GS	Palm Bay, FL
G	30	Owen LaRocca	6 ft 1 in (1.85 m)	160 lb (73 kg)	Sr	Sugar Land, TX
F	31	Joshua Hughes	6 ft 5 in (1.96 m)	215 lb (98 kg)	Jr	Woodstock, GA
F	33	Jaden Brownell	6 ft 9 in (2.06 m)	230 lb (104 kg)	Jr	Sandy, UT
F/C	35	Riley Allenspach	6 ft 11 in (2.11 m)	247 lb (112 kg)	So	Charlotte, NC

Head coach

- Bucky McMillan (Birmingham–Southern)

Assistant coach(es)

- Mitch Cole (Montana State Billings)
- Danny Young (Grand Canyon)
- Neb Exantus (Southern New Hampshire)
- Lorenzo Jenkins
- David Good (Central Michigan)

Legend

- (C) Team captain
- (S) Suspended
- (I) Ineligible
- (W) Walk-on
- Injured
- Current redshirt

Roster
Last update: October 27, 2024

== Schedule and results ==
Date time, TV	Rank^{#}	Opponent^{#}	Result	Record	High points	High rebounds	High assists	Site (attendance) city, state
Non-conference regular season
November 4, 2024*; 6:30 p.m., ESPN+		Mississippi College	W 100–58	1–0	20 – Brownell	6 – Brownell	7 – Jones	Pete Hanna Center (1,871); Homewood, AL
November 8, 2024*; 5:00 p.m., ESPN+		at Cornell	L 86–88	1–1	21 – C. Holloway	9 – Fort	5 – Jones	Newman Arena (964); Ithaca, NY
November 12, 2024*; 6:30 p.m., ESPN+		Rhodes	W 108–52	2–1	16 – Tied	9 – Walls	4 – Fort	Pete Hanna Center (1,209); Homewood, AL
November 15, 2024*; 7:45 p.m., ESPN+		at North Alabama; SoCon/ASUN Challenge	W 97–96 ^{OT}	3–1	24 – Brownell	8 – Brownell	8 – Jones	CB&S Bank Arena (2,732); Florence, AL
November 17, 2024*; 2:00 p.m., ESPN+		Texas Southern	W 97–82	4–1	18 – Jones	5 – Olayinka	8 – Jones	Pete Hanna Center (1,062); Homewood, AL
November 19, 2024*; 7:00 p.m., Peacock		at Michigan State	L 75–83	4–2	19 – Brownell	9 – Brownell	8 – Jones	Breslin Center (14,797); East Lansing, MI
November 26, 2024*; 6:30 p.m., ESPN+		North Dakota State; Samford MTE	W 103–98 ^{OT}	5–2	24 – Tied	11 – C. Holloway	7 – J. Holloway	Pete Hanna Center (1,213); Homewood, AL
November 27, 2024*; 6:30 p.m., ESPN+		Utah Valley; Samford MTE	W 84–76	6–2	22 – Brownell	6 – Tied	6 – C. Holloway	Pete Hanna Center (913); Homewood, AL
November 29, 2024*; 3:00 p.m., ESPN+		West Georgia; Samford MTE	W 86–65	7–2	16 – Fort	6 – Allenspach	6 – J. Holloway	Pete Hanna Center (887); Homewood, AL
December 5, 2024*; 6:00 p.m.		at South Carolina State	W 88–81	8–2	25 – Fort	5 – Walls	7 – Jones	SHM Memorial Center (211); Orangeburg, SC
December 8, 2024*; 2:00 p.m., ESPN+		Austin Peay; SoCon/ASUN Challenge	W 72–47	9–2	15 – Tied	8 – Walls	5 – Jones	Pete Hanna Center (1,337); Homewood, AL
December 18, 2024*; 8:00 p.m., ESPN+		at Arizona	L 64–96	9–3	13 – Brownwell	5 – Jones	5 – Jones	McKale Center (12,847); Tucson, AZ
December 21, 2024*; 7:00 p.m.		at Alabama A&M	W 97–90	10–3	27 – Fort	5 – Fort	5 – Jones	Alabama A&M Events Center (1,003); Huntsville, AL
SoCon regular season
January 1, 2025; 6:30 p.m., ESPN+		The Citadel	W 86–56	11–3 (1–0)	19 – Fort	9 – C. Holloway	6 – Tied	Pete Hanna Center (1,048); Homewood, AL
January 4, 2025; 2:00 p.m., ESPN+		at Western Carolina	W 88–69	12–3 (2–0)	23 – Brownell	6 – C. Holloway	6 – Jones	Ramsey Center (2,798); Cullowhee, NC
January 9, 2025; 7:00 p.m., ESPN+		VMI	W 81–68	13–3 (3–0)	20 – Brownell	12 – C. Holloway	5 – Jones	Pete Hanna Center (733); Homewood, AL
January 11, 2025; 5:00 p.m., ESPN+		UNC Greensboro	W 76–69	14–3 (4–0)	21 – Fort	6 – C. Holloway	6 – Jones	Pete Hanna Center (1,789); Homewood, AL
January 15, 2025; 6:00 p.m., ESPN+		at Mercer	W 75–74	15–3 (5–0)	18 – Brownell	8 – C. Holloway	5 – Jones	Hawkins Arena (2,219); Macon, GA
January 18, 2025; 5:00 p.m., CBSSN		East Tennessee State	L 60–65	15–4 (5–1)	12 – Jones	10 – C. Holloway	4 – Tied	Pete Hanna Center (4,723); Homewood, AL
January 23, 2025; 6:00 p.m., ESPNU		at Chattanooga	W 73–69	16–4 (6–1)	20 – Brownell	7 – Walls	6 – Jones	McKenzie Arena (3,679); Chattanooga, TN
January 25, 2025; 5:00 p.m., ESPN+		Wofford	W 77–61	17–4 (7–1)	18 – Brownell	5 – Tied	5 – Jones	Pete Hanna Center (3,317); Homewood, AL
January 29, 2025; 5:00 p.m., CBSSN		at Furman	L 70–72	17–5 (7–2)	19 – Jones	6 – Holloway	2 – Tied	Bon Secours Wellness Arena (2,737); Greenville, SC
February 1, 2025; 12:00 p.m., ESPN+		at The Citadel	W 83–58	18–5 (8–2)	17 – Fort	6 – Walls	5 – Walls	McAlister Field House (957); Charleston, SC
February 5, 2025; 6:30 p.m., ESPN+		Mercer	W 100–79	19–5 (9–2)	23 – Jones	7 – C. Holloway	6 – Jones	Pete Hanna Center (1,284); Homewood, AL
February 8, 2025; 3:00 p.m., ESPN+		at East Tennessee State	L 59–66	19–6 (9–3)	18 – Brownell	9 – Allenspach	3 – Jones	Freedom Hall Civic Center (5,472); Johnson City, TN
February 12, 2025; 6:30 p.m., ESPN+		Chattanooga	L 68–82	19–7 (9–4)	18 – J. Holloway	6 – Allenspach	4 – J. Holloway	Pete Hanna Center (2,311); Homewood, AL
February 15, 2025; 1:00 p.m., ESPN+		at Wofford	W 76–68	20–7 (10–4)	36 – Fort	8 – Fort	3 – Jones	Jerry Richardson Indoor Stadium (1,533); Spartanburg, SC
February 19, 2025; 6:30 p.m., ESPN+		Furman	L 72–80	20–8 (10–5)	25 – Brownell	5 – Tied	5 – Jones	Pete Hanna Center (2,165); Homewood, AL
February 22, 2025; 2:00 p.m., ESPN+		Western Carolina	W 93–72	21–8 (11–5)	24 – Fort	5 – Tied	7 – Jones	Pete Hanna Center (2,306); Homewood, AL
February 27, 2025; 5:00 p.m., ESPN+		at VMI	W 95–83	22–8 (12–5)	24 – C. Holloway	8 – Allenspach	4 – Walls	Cameron Hall (2,613); Lexington, VA
March 1, 2025; 3:00 p.m., ESPNews		at UNC Greensboro	L 100–108	22–9 (12–6)	29 – Fort	8 – Fort	4 – Fort	Fleming Gymnasium (1,322); Greensboro, NC
SoCon tournament
March 8, 2025; 7:30 p.m., ESPN+	(4)	vs. (5) Furman; Quarterfinals	L 78–95	22–10	21 – J. Holloway	6 – Fort	9 – Jones	Harrah's Cherokee Center (5,459); Asheville, NC
NIT
March 19, 2025; 6:00 p.m., ESPN+		at (2) George Mason; First round – Dayton Region	L 69–86	22–11	27 – Brownell	9 – Fort	8 – Jones	EagleBank Arena (2,021); Fairfax, VA
*Non-conference game. ^{#}Rankings from AP Poll. (#) Tournament seedings in parentheses. All times are in Central.
