= Dwight Perry =

American basketball player and coach

Current position
- Title: Associate head coach
- Team: East Tennessee State
- Conference: Southern Conference

Biographical details
- Born: November 9, 1987 (age 39); Durham, North Carolina, U.S.
- Education: University of Kentucky (2009)

Playing career
- 2006–2009: Kentucky

Coaching career (HC unless noted)
- 2011–2014: VCU (GA)
- 2014–2019: Furman (assistant)
- 2019–2021: Wofford (assistant)
- 2021–2022: Wofford (associate HC)
- 2022–2025: Wofford
- 2026–present: East Tennessee State (associate HC)

Administrative career (AD unless noted)
- 2009–2011: Stanford (intern)

Head coaching record
- Overall: 48–43 (.527)
- Tournaments: 0–1 (NCAA)

Accomplishments and honors

Championships
- SoCon tournament (2025)

Dwight Perry (born November 9, 1987) is an American basketball player and coach. He is currently the associate head coach for the East Tennessee State Buccaneers of the Southern Conference. He was previously the head coach of the Wofford Terriers men's basketball team.

== Playing career ==
Perry played three years at Kentucky. He played in 19 games for the Wildcats, averaging 0.3 points, 0.2 rebounds, and 0.1 assists per game.

== Coaching career ==
=== Assistant coach (2011-2022) ===
He started out as an intern for Stanford and he coached there for two years. Then he became a graduate assistant for VCU, he would coach there for three years. Next he became an assistant coach for Furman for five years. On April 18, 2019, Wofford hired Perry as an assistant coach.

=== Wofford (2021-2025) ===
On September 10, 2021, the Terriers promoted Perry to Associate head coach. After head coach Jay McAuley resigned after taking a month long leave of absence, Perry was named the interim head coach on December 5, 2022. On March 21, 2023 the Terriers removed the interim tag and made him their next head coach.

Wofford abruptly fired Perry in September 2025, less than a month prior to the 2025-26 season, amid reports that several Wofford players had received improper financial benefits.

=== East Tennessee State (2026–present) ===
In July 2026, Perry was hired as the associate head coach at East Tennessee State, his first coaching position since his firing at Wofford.

== Head coaching record ==
Record table
Season	Team	Overall	Conference	Standing	Postseason
Wofford Terriers (Southern Conference) (2022–2025)
2022–23	Wofford	12–12	8–10	T–5th	
2023–24	Wofford	17–15	10–8	T–5th	
2024–25	Wofford	19–16	10–8	6th	NCAA Division I Round of 64
Wofford:		48–43 (.527)	28–26 (.519)		
Total:		48–43 (.527)			
