= 2025 Southern Conference men's basketball tournament =

American college basketball postseason tournament

- Classification: Division I
- Season: 2024–25
- Teams: 10
- Site: Harrah's Cherokee Center; Asheville, North Carolina
- Champions: Wofford (6th title)
- Winning coach: Dwight Perry (1st title)
- Attendance: 6,332 (championship)
- Television: ESPN+, Nexstar, ESPNU/ESPN2, ESPN

2024–25 Southern Conference men's basketball standings
	Conf.				Overall
Team	W		L	PCT	W		L	PCT
Chattanooga	15	–	3	.833	29	–	9	.763
UNC Greensboro	13	–	5	.722	20	–	12	.625
East Tennessee State	12	–	6	.667	19	–	13	.594
Samford	12	–	6	.667	22	–	11	.667
Furman	11	–	7	.611	25	–	10	.714
Wofford †	10	–	8	.556	19	–	16	.543
VMI	7	–	11	.389	15	–	19	.441
Mercer	6	–	12	.333	14	–	19	.424
Western Carolina	4	–	14	.222	8	–	22	.267
The Citadel	0	–	18	.000	5	–	25	.167
† 2025 SoCon tournament winner

The 2025 Southern Conference Men's Basketball Tournament was the postseason men's basketball tournament for the Southern Conference for the 2024–25 season. All tournament games were played at the Harrah's Cherokee Center in Asheville, North Carolina, from March 7–10, 2025. The winner of the tournament, Wofford, received the conference's automatic bid to the 2025 NCAA Division I Men's Basketball Tournament.

== Seeds ==
All ten teams in the Southern Conference will be eligible to compete in the conference tournament. Teams will be seeded by record within the conference, with a tiebreaker system to seed teams with identical conference records. The top six teams will receive first-round byes.

Seed	School	Conference	Tiebreaker
1	Chattanooga	15–3	
2	UNC Greensboro	13–5	
3	East Tennessee State	12–6	2–0 vs. Samford
4	Samford	12–6	0–2 vs. East Tennessee State
5	Furman	11–7	
6	Wofford	10–8	
7	VMI	7–11	
8	Mercer	6–12	
9	Western Carolina	4–14	
10	The Citadel	0–18	

== Schedule and results ==
Game	Time	Matchup	Score	Television
First round – Friday, March 7
1	5:00 pm	No. 8 Mercer vs. No. 9 Western Carolina	67–66	ESPN+/Nexstar
2	7:30 pm	No. 7 VMI vs. No. 10 The Citadel	73–62	ESPN+/Nexstar
Quarterfinals – Saturday, March 8
3	12:00 pm	No. 1 Chattanooga vs. No. 8 Mercer	76–61	ESPN+
4	2:30 pm	No. 2 UNC Greensboro vs. No. 7 VMI	57–64	ESPN+
5	6:00 pm	No. 3 East Tennessee State vs. No. 6 Wofford	60–72	ESPN+
6	8:30 pm	No. 4 Samford vs. No. 5 Furman	78–95	ESPN+
Semifinals – Sunday, March 9
7	4:00 pm	No. 1 Chattanooga vs. No. 5 Furman	77–80^{OT}	ESPNU
8	6:30 pm	No. 7 VMI vs No. 6 Wofford	65–85	ESPNU
Championship – Monday, March 10
9	7:00 pm	No. 5 Furman vs. No. 6 Wofford	85–92	ESPN
*Game times in EST for the first round and quarterfinals and EDT for the semifinals and championship. Rankings denote tournament seed

== Bracket ==
First round March 7 ESPN+/Nexstar
8	Mercer	67
9	Western Carolina	66
7	VMI	73
10	The Citadel	62

Quarterfinals; March 8 ESPN+
1	Chattanooga	76
8	Mercer	61
4	Samford	78
5	Furman	95
2	UNC Greensboro	57
7	VMI	64
3	East Tennessee State	60
6	Wofford	72

Semifinals; March 9 ESPN2/ESPNU
1	Chattanooga	77
5	Furman	80^{OT}
7	VMI	65
6	Wofford	85

Championship; March 10; ESPN
5	Furman	85
6	Wofford	92

== See also ==
- 2025 Southern Conference women's basketball tournament
