= 2024–25 North Alabama Lions men's basketball team =

American college basketball season

2024–25 North Alabama Lions men's basketball

ASUN regular season co-champions

NIT, First round
- Conference: ASUN Conference
- Record: 24–11 (14–4 ASUN)
- Head coach: Tony Pujol (7th season)
- Associate head coach: Ahmad Smith
- Assistant coaches: Carter Heston; Austin Burnette; Sean Foley
- Home arena: CB&S Bank Arena

2024–25 ASUN men's basketball standings
	Conf.				Overall
Team	W		L	PCT	W		L	PCT
Lipscomb †	14	–	4	.778	25	–	10	.714
North Alabama	14	–	4	.778	24	–	11	.686
Florida Gulf Coast	13	–	5	.722	19	–	15	.559
Jacksonville	12	–	6	.667	19	–	14	.576
Eastern Kentucky	12	–	6	.667	18	–	14	.563
Queens*	11	–	7	.611	20	–	15	.571
Austin Peay	8	–	10	.444	14	–	19	.424
North Florida	8	–	10	.444	15	–	17	.469
Stetson	6	–	12	.333	8	–	24	.250
Central Arkansas	4	–	14	.222	9	–	24	.273
West Georgia*	4	–	14	.222	6	–	25	.194
Bellarmine	2	–	16	.111	5	–	26	.161
† 2025 ASUN tournament winner * ineligible for the 2025 NCAA tournament due to transition from Division II

The 2024–25 North Alabama Lions men's basketball team represented the University of North Alabama during the 2024–25 NCAA Division I men's basketball season. The Lions, led by seventh-year head coach Tony Pujol, played their home games at the CB&S Bank Arena located in Florence, Alabama as members the ASUN Conference.

== Previous season ==
The Lions finished the 2023–24 season 15–17, 8–8 in ASUN play to finish in sixth place. The Lions advanced past the first round in the ASUN tournament with a 77–75 victory over the Lipscomb Bisons, courtesy of a KJ Johnson buzzer-beater. The Lions' season would come to an end in the ASUN semifinals as they were defeated by the Austin Peay Governors in a 77–71 defeat.

== Roster ==
2024–25 North Alabama Lions men's basketball team
Players
Coaches

Pos.	#	Name	Height	Weight	Year	Previous school	Hometown
G	0	Will Soucie	6 ft 6 in (1.98 m)	215 lb (98 kg)	Sr	Gill St. Bernard's School	Califon, New Jersey
F	1	Donte Bacchus	6 ft 7 in (2.01 m)	215 lb (98 kg)	Jr	Snead State CC	Homewood, Alabama
G	1	King Walker	6 ft 6 in (1.98 m)	186 lb (84 kg)	Fr	Loomis Chaffee School	Detroit, Michigan
G	2	Daniel Ortiz	6 ft 0 in (1.83 m)	185 lb (84 kg)	Sr	UAB	Shreveport, Louisiana
F	3	Corneilous Williams	6 ft 9 in (2.06 m)	210 lb (95 kg)	RS So	Western Carolina	Beaumont, Mississippi
G	4	Canin Jefferson	6 ft 2 in (1.88 m)	170 lb (77 kg)	So	Isidore Newman School	New Orleans, Louisiana
G	5	Jacari Lane	6 ft 0 in (1.83 m)	185 lb (84 kg)	Jr	Lee High School	Huntsville, Alabama
G	8	Kevin de Kovachich	6 ft 4 in (1.93 m)	192 lb (87 kg)	Fr	Hamilton Heights Academy	Montréal, Québec
G	9	Taye Fields	6 ft 4 in (1.93 m)	212 lb (96 kg)	Sr	Missouri Western	Opelika, Alabama
G	13	Blake Floyd	6 ft 0 in (1.83 m)	170 lb (77 kg)	Jr	Spain Park High School	Pelham, Alabama
C	21	Israel Jenrette	7 ft 1 in (2.16 m)	260 lb (118 kg)	Fr	Valdosta High School	Valdosta, Georgia
C	24	Mitchell Chaffee	6 ft 10 in (2.08 m)	230 lb (104 kg)	Fr	Calhoun CC	Muscle Shoals, Alabama
F	25	DarKaun King	6 ft 7 in (2.01 m)	215 lb (98 kg)	Fr	TACA Academy	Dallas, Texas
F	34	Dallas Howell	6 ft 7 in (2.01 m)	205 lb (93 kg)	Sr	Enterprise High School	Coffee Springs, Alabama
C	35	Jamal Albritton	6 ft 9 in (2.06 m)	245 lb (111 kg)	Sr	Wallace-Selma CC	Montgomery, Alabama

Head coach

- Tony Pujol (Sterling)

Assistant coach(es)

- Ahmad Smith (Appalachian State)
- Carter Heston (Alabama)
- Austin Burnette (Campbell)
- Sean Foley (McDaniel)

Legend

- (C) Team captain
- (S) Suspended
- (I) Ineligible
- (W) Walk-on
- Injured
- Current redshirt

Roster
Last update: August 20, 2024

== Schedule and results ==
Date time, TV	Rank^{#}	Opponent^{#}	Result	Record	High points	High rebounds	High assists	Site (attendance) city, state
Non-conference regular season
November 4, 2024*; 8:30 pm, MW Network		at Air Force	W 73–57	1–0	24 – Lane	5 – Howell	6 – Lane	Clune Arena (1,212); Colorado Springs, CO
November 7, 2024*; 11:00 am, ESPN+		Point	W 94–58	2–0	14 – Jefferson	9 – Jenrette	1 – Tied	CB&S Bank Arena (3,000); Florence, AL
November 11, 2024*; 6:00 pm, ESPN+		UT Martin	W 87–69	3–0	22 – Lane	10 – Tied	4 – Tied	CB&S Bank Arena (2,212); Florence, AL
November 15, 2024*; 7:45 pm, ESPN+		Samford; SoCon/ASUN Challenge	L 96–97 ^{OT}	3–1	32 – Lane	16 – Williams	6 – Lane	CB&S Bank Arena (2,732); Florence, AL
November 18, 2024*; 8:00 pm, SECN		at No. 4 Auburn	L 69–102	3–2	16 – Lane	8 – Williams	3 – Soucie	Neville Arena (9,121); Auburn, AL
November 23, 2024*; 4:00 pm		vs. Louisiana–Monroe; City of Lights MTE	W 74–62	4–2	19 – Ortiz	9 – Fields	4 – Lane	Prather Coliseum (112); Natchitoches, LA
November 24, 2024*; 2:00 pm, ESPN+		at Northwestern State; City of Lights MTE	L 58–71	4–3	14 – Lane	9 – Williams	3 – Fields	Prather Coliseum (228); Natchitoches, LA
November 27, 2024*; 1:00 pm, ESPN+		Dalton State	W 100–69	5–3	23 – de Kovachich	9 – Fields	6 – Lane	CB&S Bank Arena (1,127); Florence, AL
December 1, 2024*; 3:00 pm, ESPN+		at Wofford; SoCon/ASUN Challenge	L 54–74	5–4	11 – Bacchus	6 – Williams	3 – Lane	Jerry Richardson Indoor Stadium (856); Spatanburg, SC
December 4, 2024*; 6:00 pm, ESPN+		Tennessee Tech	W 82–59	6–4	16 – Soucie	12 – Tied	4 – Lane	CB&S Bank Arena (1,537); Florence, AL
December 11, 2024*; 6:00 pm, ESPN+		at East Carolina	W 74–67	7–4	19 – Lane	11 – Fields	8 – Fields	Williams Arena (3,177); Greenville, NC
December 19, 2024*; 6:00 pm, ESPN+		Charleston Southern	W 86–69	8–4	25 – Fields	6 – Corneilous	6 – Lane	CB&S Bank Arena (1,287); Florence, AL
December 22, 2024*; 6:00 pm, ESPN+		at Loyola Marymount	L 69–85	8–5	20 – Lane	9 – Williams	4 – Lane	Gersten Pavilion (818); Los Angeles, CA
ASUN regular season
January 2, 2025; 6:00 pm, ESPN+		Bellarmine	W 82–66	9–5 (1–0)	26 – Ortiz	15 – Williams	10 – Lane	CB&S Bank Arena (1,563); Florence, AL
January 4, 2025; 4:30 pm, ESPN+		Eastern Kentucky	W 88–67	10–5 (2–0)	18 – Tied	14 – Fields	7 – Fields	CB&S Bank Arena (2,025); Florence, AL
January 9, 2025; 6:00 pm, ESPN+		at FGCU	L 70–75	10–6 (2–1)	22 – Lane	10 – Fields	8 – Fields	Alico Arena (2,009); Fort Myers, FL
January 11, 2025; 3:00 pm, ESPN+		at Stetson	W 92–64	11–6 (3–1)	23 – Fields	17 – Fields	6 – Lane	Edmunds Center (498); DeLand, FL
January 16, 2025; 6:00 pm, ESPN+		at Jacksonville	L 60–64	11–7 (3–2)	15 – Lane	9 – Tied	2 – Tied	Swisher Gymnasium (1,000); Jacksonville, FL
January 18, 2025; 1:00 pm, ESPN+		at North Florida	W 90–84	12–7 (4–2)	21 – Bacchus	13 – Fields	8 – Tied	UNF Arena (1,318); Jacksonville, FL
January 23, 2025; 6:00 pm, ESPN+		Lipscomb	W 74–64	13–7 (5–2)	18 – Lane	14 – Williams	6 – Lane	CB&S Bank Arena (2,657); Florence, AL
January 25, 2025; 6:00 pm, ESPN+		Austin Peay	W 88–84 ^{OT}	14–7 (6–2)	28 – Ortiz	18 – Fields	5 – Tied	CB&S Bank Arena (3,000); Florence, AL
January 29, 2025; 6:00 pm, ESPN+		at Queens	L 67–75	14–8 (6–3)	22 – Lane	13 – Fields	2 – Lane	Curry Arena (596); Charlotte, NC
February 1, 2025; 7:45 pm, ESPN+		Central Arkansas	W 94–65	15–8 (7–3)	21 – Ortiz	6 – Williams	5 – Fields	CB&S Bank Arena (2,392); Florence, AL
February 5, 2025; 7:00 pm, ESPN+		at Austin Peay	W 74–64	16–8 (8–3)	22 – Soucie	11 – Fields	5 – Lane	F&M Bank Arena (1,759); Clarksville, TN
February 8, 2025; 1:00 pm, ESPN+		at West Georgia	W 78–61	17–8 (9–3)	17 – Soucie	19 – Williams	5 – Lane	The Coliseum (1,723); Carrollton, GA
February 13, 2025; 6:00 pm, ESPN+		North Florida	W 83–70	18–8 (10–3)	21 – Lane	14 – Tied	7 – Lane	CB&S Bank Arena (2,391); Florence, AL
February 15, 2025; 1:00 pm, ESPN+		Jacksonville	W 92–79	19–8 (11–3)	25 – Lane	10 – Bacchus	7 – Fields	CB&S Bank Arena (2,939); Florence, AL
February 18, 2025; 6:00 pm, ESPN+		West Georgia	W 80–62	20–8 (12–3)	22 – Lane	12 – Williams	3 – Tied	CB&S Bank Arena (2,395); Florence, AL
February 20, 2025; 7:00 pm, ESPN+		at Lipscomb	L 63–75	20–9 (12–4)	18 – Lane	7 – Bacchus	3 – Lane	Allen Arena (2,431); Nashville, TN
February 24, 2025; 6:30 pm, ESPN+		at Central Arkansas	W 93–70	21–9 (13–4)	20 – Tied	8 – Fields	9 – Fields	Farris Center (774); Conway, AR
February 26, 2025; 6:00 pm, ESPN+		Queens	W 74–69	22–9 (14–4)	20 – Lane	9 – Fields	4 – Fields	CB&S Bank Arena (2,992); Florence, AL
ASUN tournament
March 3, 2025; 7:00 pm, ESPN+	(2)	(7) Austin Peay; Quarterfinals	W 90–64	23–9	31 – Lane	14 – Williams	4 – Fields	CB&S Bank Arena (3,000); Florence, AL
March 6, 2025; 7:00 pm, ESPN+	(2)	(4) Jacksonville; Semifinals	W 78–63	24–9	19 – Lane	12 – Williams	6 – Lane	CB&S Bank Arena (3,000); Florence, AL
March 9, 2025; 1:00 pm, ESPN2	(2)	at (1) Lipscomb; Championship	L 65–76	24–10	18 – Lane	12 – Fields	6 – Fields	Allen Arena (5,139); Nashville, TN
National Invitation Tournament
March 19, 2025; 7:00 pm, ESPN+		at (3) Bradley; First Round - Dayton Region	L 62–71	24–11	19 – Bacchus	12 – Williams	2 – Jefferson	Carver Arena; Peoria, IL
*Non-conference game. ^{#}Rankings from AP Poll. (#) Tournament seedings in parentheses. All times are in Central.
