= Freedom Hall Civic Center =

Arena in Tennessee, United States

- Interactive map of Freedom Hall Civic Center
- Location: 1320 Pactolas Road Johnson City, TN 37604
- Coordinates: 36°19′28″N 82°22′30″W
- Owner: Johnson City, Tennessee
- Capacity: Events: 8,500; Basketball: 6,149

Construction
- Opened: 1974
- Cost: $5 million

Tenants
- East Tennessee State University (2014–present); Science Hill High School (1974–present)

Freedom Hall Civic Center is a multi-purpose arena in Johnson City, Tennessee.

Starting in 2014, it became the basketball venue for East Tennessee State University.

== History ==
Former and current entertainment include concerts from Van Halen, Bon Jovi, Eric Clapton, Def Leppard, Poison (band), Ozzy Osbourne, Mötley Crüe, Kiss, Bruce Springsteen, Third Day, For King & Country, Chicago, AC/DC, Lynyrd Skynyrd, Metallica, Elvis Presley, Elton John, and Aerosmith. Entertainment from professional wrestling organizations Jim Crockett Promotions, WWE, Smoky Mountain Wrestling, and from the Ringling Bros. and Barnum & Bailey Circus.

== See also ==
- List of NCAA Division I basketball arenas
