= 2025–26 Samford Bulldogs men's basketball team =

American college basketball season

2025–26 Samford Bulldogs men's basketball
- Conference: Southern Conference
- Record: 18–14 (11–7 SoCon)
- Head coach: Lennie Acuff (1st season)
- Associate head coach: Tyler Murray
- Assistant coaches: Vince Martin; Kip Owens; Will Acuff; Peyton Mattingly
- Home arena: Pete Hanna Center

2025–26 Southern Conference men's basketball standings
	Conf.				Overall
Team	W		L	PCT	W		L	PCT
East Tennessee State	13	–	5	.722	23	–	11	.676
Wofford	11	–	7	.611	19	–	13	.594
Samford	11	–	7	.611	18	–	14	.563
Mercer	11	–	7	.611	19	–	13	.594
Western Carolina	10	–	8	.556	15	–	16	.484
Furman †	10	–	8	.556	22	–	12	.647
UNC Greensboro	9	–	9	.500	15	–	19	.441
Chattanooga	7	–	11	.389	13	–	19	.406
The Citadel	7	–	11	.389	11	–	22	.333
VMI	1	–	17	.056	6	–	26	.188
† 2026 SoCon tournament winner As of March 9, 2026

The 2025–26 Samford Bulldogs men's basketball team represented Samford University during the 2025–26 NCAA Division I men's basketball season. The Bulldogs, led by first-year head coach Lennie Acuff, played their home games at the Pete Hanna Center in Homewood, Alabama as members of the Southern Conference (SoCon).

== Previous season ==
The Bulldogs finished the 2024–25 season 22–11, 12–6 in SoCon play, to finish in a tie for third place. They were defeated by Furman in the quarterfinals of the SoCon tournament. They received an invitation to the NIT, where they would be defeated by George Mason in the first round.

On April 4, 2025, it was announced that head coach Bucky McMillan would be leaving the program, in order to take the head coaching position at Texas A&M. Four days later, on April 9, it was announced that the school would be hiring Lipscomb head coach Lennie Acuff, as McMillan's successor.

== Preseason ==
On October 1, 2025, the SoCon released their preseason coaches poll. Samford was picked to finish third in the conference.

=== Preseason rankings ===
SoCon Preseason Poll
Place	Team	Points
1	Chattanooga	77 (5)
2	Furman	73 (5)
3	Samford	62
4	East Tennessee State	61
5	UNC Greensboro	43
6	VMI	41
7	Western Carolina	32
8	Mercer	30
9	Wofford	21
10	The Citadel	10
(#) first-place votes

=== Preseason All-SoCon Team ===
Preseason All-SoCon Team
Player	Year	Position
Jadin Booth	Graduate Student	Guard
Dylan Faulkner	Junior	Center

== Roster ==
2025–26 Samford Bulldogs men's basketball team
Players
Coaches

Pos.	#	Name	Height	Weight	Year	Previous school	Hometown
G	0	Isaiah Campbell-Finch	6 ft 0 in (1.83 m)	165 lb (75 kg)	Fr	Tampa Catholic High School	Tampa, Florida
G	1	DaJion Humphrey	6 ft 4 in (1.93 m)	185 lb (84 kg)	GS	Bowling Green	Detroit, Michigan
G	2	Jadin Booth	6 ft 2 in (1.88 m)	185 lb (84 kg)	GS	Florida Southern	Omaha, Nebraska
G	3	Keaton Norris	6 ft 0 in (1.83 m)	175 lb (79 kg)	RS Sr	Wright State	Hilliard, Ohio
F	4	Judson Bjornstad	6 ft 8 in (2.03 m)	200 lb (91 kg)	So	Union	Murfreesboro, Tennessee
G	5	Cade Norris	6 ft 4 in (1.93 m)	200 lb (91 kg)	So	Illinois State	Hilliard, Ohio
G	7	JD Gossett	6 ft 5 in (1.96 m)	185 lb (84 kg)	Fr	Huntsville High School	Huntsville, Alabama
G	8	Zion Wilburn	6 ft 5 in (1.96 m)	190 lb (86 kg)	So	AZ Compass Prep School	Richmond, California
G	10	Kam Martin	6 ft 4 in (1.93 m)	175 lb (79 kg)	So	Long Beach State	Montgomery County, Maryland
G	11	Cooper Davenport	5 ft 11 in (1.8 m)	160 lb (73 kg)	Fr	Henderson County High School	Henderson, Kentucky
F	15	Dylan Faulkner	6 ft 9 in (2.06 m)	215 lb (98 kg)	Jr	Lipscomb	Calhoun, Georgia
G	21	Corey Brown	6 ft 4 in (1.93 m)	175 lb (79 kg)	So	Landmark Christian School	Fairburn, Georgia
F	22	Jaxon Pollard	6 ft 7 in (2.01 m)	225 lb (102 kg)	GS	Queens	Cedar Hills, Utah
F	23	Caleb Harrison	6 ft 9 in (2.06 m)	205 lb (93 kg)	RS Fr	Huntsville High School	Huntsville, Alabama
F	31	Joshua Hughes	6 ft 5 in (1.96 m)	215 lb (98 kg)	Sr	Etowah High School	Woodstock, Georgia
G	33	Zach Lamey	6 ft 3 in (1.91 m)	175 lb (79 kg)	RS So	Lipscomb	Birmingham, Alabama
C	35	Will Shaver	6 ft 10 in (2.08 m)	265 lb (120 kg)	RS So	UAB	Birmingham, Alabama

Head coach

- Lennie Acuff (Shorter)

Assistant coach(es)

- Tyler Murray (Hampden–Sydney)
- Vince Martin (Jacksonville)
- Kip Owens (Alabama–Huntsville)
- Will Acuff (Alabama–Huntsville)
- Peyton Mattingly (Lipscomb)

Legend

- (C) Team captain
- (S) Suspended
- (I) Ineligible
- (W) Walk-on
- Injured
- Current redshirt

Roster
Last update: October 24, 2025

== Schedule and results ==
Date time, TV	Rank^{#}	Opponent^{#}	Result	Record	Site (attendance) city, state
Exhibition
October 13, 2025*; 7:00 pm		vs. Alabama A&M; Ballin In Boutwell	L 73–74	–	Boutwell Memorial Auditorium; Birmingham, AL
Non-conference regular season
November 3, 2025*; 7:30 pm, ESPN+		at Tulane	L 72–85	0–1	Devlin Fieldhouse (1,476); New Orleans, LA
November 7, 2025*; 7:30 pm, ESPN+		South Carolina State	W 82–72	1–1	Pete Hanna Center (2,371); Homewood, AL
November 12, 2025*; 7:00 pm		at Texas Southern	W 93–90 ^{OT}	2–1	H&PE Arena (275); Houston, TX
November 14, 2025*; 7:00 pm, SECN+		at No. 21 Arkansas	L 75–79	2–2	Bud Walton Arena (19,200); Fayetteville, AR
November 16, 2025*; 1:00 pm, ESPN+		at Central Arkansas; SoCon/ASUN Challenge	W 84–77 ^{OT}	3–2	Farris Center (819); Conway, AR
November 19, 2025*; 6:00 pm, ESPN+		Florida Gulf Coast; SoCon/ASUN Challenge	L 62–77	3–3	Pete Hanna Center (2,173); Homewood, AL
November 21, 2025*; 8:00 pm, ESPN+		at New Mexico State; Cancún Challenge campus game	L 72–81	3–4	Pan American Center (4,484); Las Cruces, NM
November 25, 2025*; 2:00 pm, FloCollege		vs. Georgia State; Cancún Challenge	W 78–63	4–4	Hard Rock Hotel Riviera Maya; Cancún, Mexico
November 26, 2025*; 5:00 pm, FloCollege		vs. Utah Valley; Cancún Challenge	L 45–89	4–5	Hard Rock Hotel Riviera Maya; Cancún, Mexico
December 5, 2025*; 6:00 pm, ESPN+		at VCU	L 57–83	4–6	Siegel Center (7,637); Richmond, VA
December 7, 2025*; 6:00 pm, ESPN+		Cornell	W 93–90	5–6	Pete Hanna Center (1,413); Homewood, AL
December 15, 2025*; 12:00 pm, ESPN+		Bryan	W 106–51	6–6	Pete Hanna Center (613); Homewood, AL
December 19, 2025*; 12:00 pm, ESPN+		Reinhardt	W 85−49	7−6	Pete Hanna Center (913); Homewood, AL
SoCon regular season
January 1, 2026; 12:00 pm, ESPN+		at VMI	W 78−58	8−6 (1−0)	Cameron Hall (652); Lexington, VA
January 3, 2026; 3:00 pm, ESPN+		at UNC Greensboro	L 82−89	8−7 (1−1)	Bodford Arena (439); Greensboro, NC
January 7, 2026; 6:00 pm, ESPN+		Western Carolina	W 82–77	9–7 (2–1)	Pete Hanna Center (813); Homewood, AL
January 10, 2026; 3:30 pm, ESPN+		at Chattanooga	L 79–88	9–8 (2–2)	McKenzie Arena (4,312); Chattanooga, TN
January 14, 2026; 6:00 pm, ESPN+		Furman	L 73–77	9–9 (2–3)	Pete Hanna Center (1,833); Homewood, AL
January 17, 2026; 3:00 pm, CBSSN		East Tennessee State	L 75–76	9–10 (2–4)	Pete Hanna Center (2,103); Homewood, AL
January 21, 2026; 5:00 pm, ESPN+		at Wofford	L 78–88	9–11 (2–5)	Jerry Richardson Indoor Stadium (969); Spartanburg, SC
January 24, 2026; 1:00 pm, ESPNews		Chattanooga	W 75–64	10–11 (3–5)	Pete Hanna Center (1,533); Homewood, AL
January 29, 2026; 4:00 pm, CBSSN		at Furman	L 73–78	10–12 (3–6)	Timmons Arena (2,037); Greenville, SC
January 31, 2026; 12:00 pm, ESPN+		at Western Carolina	W 88–74	11–12 (4–6)	Ramsey Center (1,146); Cullowhee, NC
February 5, 2026; 7:00 pm, ESPN+		The Citadel	W 78–64	12–12 (5–6)	Pete Hanna Center (1,145); Homewood, AL
February 7, 2026; 5:00 pm, ESPN+		Mercer	W 69–49	13–12 (6–6)	Pete Hanna Center (1,521); Homewood, AL
February 11, 2026; 6:00 pm, ESPN+		Wofford	W 97–80	14–12 (7–6)	Pete Hanna Center (1,123); Homewood, AL
February 14, 2026; 3:00 pm, ESPN+		at East Tennessee State	W 82–72 ^{OT}	15–12 (8–6)	Freedom Hall Civic Center (5,138); Johnson City, TN
February 19, 2026; 6:00 pm, ESPN+		at The Citadel	W 78–75	16–12 (9–6)	McAlister Field House (1,721); Charleston, SC
February 21, 2026; 1:00 pm, ESPN+		at Mercer	L 86–89	16–13 (9–7)	Hawkins Arena (1,138); Macon, GA
February 26, 2026; 7:00 pm, ESPN+		VMI	W 80–61	17–13 (10–7)	Pete Hanna Center (1,213); Homewood, AL
February 28, 2026; 5:00 pm, ESPN+		UNC Greensboro	W 87–78	18–13 (11–7)	Pete Hanna Center (1,875); Homewood, AL
SoCon tournament
March 7, 2026; 6:00 pm, ESPN+	(3)	vs. (6) Furman; Quarterfinals	L 81–86	18–14	Harrah's Cherokee Center; Asheville, NC
*Non-conference game. ^{#}Rankings from AP Poll. (#) Tournament seedings in parentheses. All times are in Central.
