= 2025–26 Wofford Terriers men's basketball team =

American college basketball season

2025–26 Wofford Terriers men's basketball
- Conference: Southern Conference
- Record: 19–13 (11–7 SoCon)
- Head coach: Kevin Giltner (1st season)
- Assistant coaches: Drew Gibson; Jeremiah Samarrippas; Trent Patterson; Kevin McGeehan
- Home arena: Jerry Richardson Indoor Stadium

2025–26 Southern Conference men's basketball standings
| | Conf. | | | | Overall |
| Team | W | | L | PCT | W | | L | PCT |
|---|---|---|---|---|---|---|---|---|
| East Tennessee State | 13 | – | 5 | .722 | 23 | – | 11 | .676 |
| Wofford | 11 | – | 7 | .611 | 19 | – | 13 | .594 |
| Samford | 11 | – | 7 | .611 | 18 | – | 14 | .563 |
| Mercer | 11 | – | 7 | .611 | 19 | – | 13 | .594 |
| Western Carolina | 10 | – | 8 | .556 | 15 | – | 16 | .484 |
| Furman † | 10 | – | 8 | .556 | 22 | – | 12 | .647 |
| UNC Greensboro | 9 | – | 9 | .500 | 15 | – | 19 | .441 |
| Chattanooga | 7 | – | 11 | .389 | 13 | – | 19 | .406 |
| The Citadel | 7 | – | 11 | .389 | 11 | – | 22 | .333 |
| VMI | 1 | – | 17 | .056 | 6 | – | 26 | .188 |
† 2026 SoCon tournament winner As of March 9, 2026

The 2025–26 Wofford Terriers men's basketball team represented Wofford College during the 2025–26 NCAA Division I men's basketball season. The Terriers, led by first-year head coach Kevin Giltner, played their home games at Jerry Richardson Indoor Stadium in Spartanburg, South Carolina as members of the Southern Conference (SoCon).

== Previous season ==
The Terriers finished the 2024–25 season 19–16, 10–8 in SoCon play, to finish in sixth place. They defeated East Tennessee State, VMI, and Furman to win the SoCon tournament championship, earning the Terriers their first trip to the NCAA tournament since 2019. In the NCAA tournament, Wofford would receive the #15 seed in the Midwest Region, where they would lose in the First Round to #2 region seed Tennessee.

On September 12, 2025, it was announced that the school would be firing head coach Dwight Perry, after just two seasons. Ten days later, on September 22, the school officially announced that they would be hiring Virginia Tech assistant and Wofford alumnus Kevin Giltner to be the team's new head coach.

== Preseason ==
On October 1, 2025, the SoCon released their preseason coaches poll. Wofford was picked to finish ninth in the conference.

=== Preseason rankings ===
SoCon Preseason Poll
| Place | Team | Points |
|---|---|---|
| 1 | Chattanooga | 77 (5) |
| 2 | Furman | 73 (5) |
| 3 | Samford | 62 |
| 4 | East Tennessee State | 61 |
| 5 | UNC Greensboro | 43 |
| 6 | VMI | 41 |
| 7 | Western Carolina | 32 |
| 8 | Mercer | 30 |
| 9 | Wofford | 21 |
| 10 | The Citadel | 10 |
(#) first-place votes

=== Preseason All-SoCon Team ===
No players were named the Preseason All-SoCon Team.

== Roster ==
2025–26 Wofford Terriers men's basketball team
Players
Coaches

| Pos. | # | Name | Height | Weight | Year | Previous school | Hometown |
|---|---|---|---|---|---|---|---|
| G | 0 | Cayden Vasko | 6 ft 6 in (1.98 m) | 195 lb (88 kg) | Jr | Central Michigan | Lowell, Indiana |
| F | 1 | Brian Sumpter | 6 ft 8 in (2.03 m) | 185 lb (84 kg) | Fr | Keenan High School | Columbia, South Carolina |
| G | 2 | Luke Flynn | 6 ft 1 in (1.85 m) | 185 lb (84 kg) | So | Walton High School | Marietta, Georgia |
| G | 4 | Chace Watley | 6 ft 2 in (1.88 m) | 187 lb (85 kg) | Fr | Totino-Grace High School | Minneapolis, Minnesota |
| G | 5 | Brendan Rigsbee | 6 ft 2 in (1.88 m) | 185 lb (84 kg) | Jr | Georgia College | Suwanee, Georgia |
| F | 7 | Cannon Richards | 6 ft 7 in (2.01 m) | 205 lb (93 kg) | So | Kell High School | Atlanta, Georgia |
| G | 8 | Jayden Tyler | 5 ft 10 in (1.78 m) | 160 lb (73 kg) | Fr | Homewood-Flossmoor High School | Chicago, Illinois |
| F | 9 | Alessandro Perotti | 6 ft 10 in (2.08 m) | 245 lb (111 kg) | Jr | Cuesta College | Turin, Italy |
| G | 10 | Maximo Ortega | 6 ft 2 in (1.88 m) | 188 lb (85 kg) | Fr | Pembroke Pines Charter High School | Weston, Florida |
| G | 11 | Kahmare Holmes | 6 ft 3 in (1.91 m) | 205 lb (93 kg) | So | Archer High School | Charlotte, North Carolina |
| G | 12 | Grayson Collins | 5 ft 11 in (1.8 m) | 170 lb (77 kg) | So | Battle Ground Academy | Nashville, Tennessee |
| G | 21 | Nils Machowski | 6 ft 3 in (1.91 m) | 183 lb (83 kg) | Jr | UCF | Berlin, Germany |
| F | 25 | Rex Stirling | 6 ft 8 in (2.03 m) | 220 lb (100 kg) | Jr | Williston State | Melbourne, Australia |
| C | 32 | Callum Richard | 6 ft 10 in (2.08 m) | 235 lb (107 kg) | Jr | East Carolina | Stanley, North Carolina |
| G | 92 | Davis Miller | 6 ft 3 in (1.91 m) | 194 lb (88 kg) | Jr | Sayre School | Lexington, Kentucky |

Head coach

- Kevin Giltner (Wofford)

Assistant coach(es)

- Drew Gibson (Wofford)
- Jeremiah Samarrippas (Tennessee Tech)
- Trent Patterson (Troy)
- Kevin McGeehan (Gettysburg)

Legend

- (C) Team captain
- (S) Suspended
- (I) Ineligible
- (W) Walk-on
- Injured
- Current redshirt

Roster
Last update: October 27, 2025

== Schedule and results ==
| Date time, TV | Rank^{#} | Opponent^{#} | Result | Record | High points | High rebounds | High assists | Site (attendance) city, state |
Non-conference regular season
| November 3, 2025*; 7:00 pm, ESPN+ | | at George Mason | L 46–70 | 0–1 | 11 – Machowski | 7 – Machowski | 5 – Vasko | EagleBank Arena (3,009); Fairfax, VA |
| November 8, 2025*; 2:00 pm, ESPN+ | | Milwaukee | W 86–76 | 1–1 | 24 – Holmes | 11 – Sumpter | 3 – Flynn | Jerry Richardson Indoor Stadium (1,342); Spartanburg, SC |
| November 11, 2025*; 8:00 pm, SECN+/ESPN+ | | at No. 22 Auburn | L 62–93 | 1–2 | 11 – Watley | 6 – Flynn | 5 – Machowski | Neville Arena (9,121); Auburn, AL |
| November 15, 2025*; 2:00 pm, ESPN+ | | at Bellarmine; SoCon/ASUN Challenge | W 94–86 | 2–2 | 28 – Machowski | 6 – Tied | 9 – Vasko | Knights Hall (829); Louisville, KY |
| November 19, 2025*; 7:00 pm, ESPN+ | | North Florida; SoCon/ASUN Challenge | W 86–78 | 3–2 | 21 – Holmes | 9 – Tied | 6 – Vasko | Jerry Richardson Indoor Stadium (1,738); Spartanburg, SC |
| November 21, 2025*; 7:00 pm, ESPN+ | | Erskine | W 81–57 | 4–2 | 13 – Tyler | 9 – Sumpter | 4 – Ortega | Jerry Richardson Indoor Stadium (1,107); Spartanburg, SC |
| November 26, 2025*; 2:00 pm, ESPN+ | | at Northern Kentucky | L 83–93 | 4–3 | 21 – Holmes | 11 – Machowski | 4 – Machowski | Truist Arena (1,574); Highland Heights, KY |
| November 29, 2025*; 5:00 pm, ESPN+ | | at Eastern Kentucky | W 83–77 | 5–3 | 30 – Holmes | 8 – Holmes | 4 – Machowski | Baptist Health Arena (708); Richmond, KY |
| December 3, 2025*; 7:00 pm, ESPN+ | | Presbyterian | W 63–56 | 6–3 | 16 – Tied | 9 – Watley | 2 – Tied | Jerry Richardson Indoor Stadium (1,410); Spartanburg, SC |
| December 6, 2025*; 4:00 pm, ESPN+ | | Elon | L 52–73 | 6–4 | 12 – Tied | 5 – Sumpter | 4 – Vasko | Jerry Richardson Indoor Stadium (1,165); Spartanburg, SC |
| December 15, 2025*; 7:00 pm, ESPN+ | | at Gardner–Webb | W 83–57 | 7–4 | 15 – Holmes | 9 – Holmes | 5 – Vasko | Paul Porter Arena (567); Boiling Springs, NC |
| December 17, 2025*; 6:30 pm, ESPN+ | | at Wichita State | L 73–84 | 7–5 | 19 – Tied | 10 – Holmes | 6 – Machowski | Charles Koch Arena (4,913); Wichita, KS |
| December 28, 2025*; 2:00 pm, ESPN+ | | Union Commonwealth | W 88–54 | 8–5 | 24 – Tyler | 5 – Watley | 5 – Vasko | Jerry Richardson Indoor Stadium (977); Spartanburg, SC |
SoCon regular season
| December 31, 2025; 1:00 pm, ESPN+ | | at Western Carolina | W 79–74 | 9–5 (1–0) | 27 – Machowski | 8 – Holmes | 4 – Vasko | Ramsey Center (1,484); Cullowhee, NC |
| January 3, 2026; 1:00 pm, ESPN+ | | at The Citadel | W 95–86 | 10–5 (2–0) | 37 – Machowski | 7 – Holmes | 9 – Holmes | McAlister Field House (1,323); Charleston, SC |
| January 7, 2026; 6:00 pm, Nexstar/ESPN+ | | UNC Greensboro | W 97–85 | 11–5 (3–0) | 27 – Holmes | 9 – Vasko | 8 – Vasko | Jerry Richardson Indoor Stadium (1,375); Spartanburg, SC |
| January 10, 2026; 2:00 pm, ESPN+ | | at Mercer | L 97–109 | 11–6 (3–1) | 33 – Machowski | 8 – Holmes | 5 – Machowski | Hawkins Arena (1,258); Macon, GA |
| January 14, 2026; 6:00 pm, ESPN+ | | Chattanooga | L 67–76 | 11–7 (3–2) | 22 – Holmes | 7 – Tied | 6 – Vasko | Jerry Richardson Indoor Stadium (1,231); Spartanburg, SC |
| January 17, 2026; 5:00 pm, Nexstar/ESPN+ | | at Furman | W 74–70 | 12–7 (4–2) | 20 – Tied | 14 – Sumpter | 3 – Tied | Timmons Arena (2,500); Greenville, SC |
| January 21, 2026; 6:00 pm, ESPN+ | | Samford | W 88–78 | 13–7 (5–2) | 36 – Holmes | 4 – Tied | 6 – Vasko | Jerry Richardson Indoor Stadium (969); Spartanburg, SC |
| January 24, 2026; 1:00 pm, Nexstar/ESPN+ | | Mercer | W 80–77 | 14–7 (6–2) | 27 – Holmes | 9 – Holmes | 7 – Holmes | Jerry Richardson Indoor Stadium (2,054); Spartanburg, SC |
| January 29, 2026; 6:00 pm, Nexstar/ESPN+ | | at Chattanooga | W 81–55 | 15–7 (7–2) | 14 – Tied | 11 – Watley | 5 – Vasko | McKenzie Arena (3,378); Chattanooga, TN |
| February 1, 2026; 7:00 pm, CBSSN | | East Tennessee State | L 72–86 | 15–8 (7–3) | 23 – Machowski | 8 – Sumpter | 5 – Vasko | Jerry Richardson Indoor Stadium (1,054); Spartanburg, SC |
| February 4, 2026; 6:00 pm, ESPN+ | | at VMI | W 81–67 | 16–8 (8–3) | 26 – Vasko | 11 – Machowski | 5 – Vasko | Cameron Hall (1,264); Lexington, VA |
| February 7, 2026; 4:00 pm, ESPN+ | | Western Carolina | W 77–66 | 17–8 (9–3) | 19 – Machowski | 11 – Machowski | 5 – Vasko | Jerry Richardson Indoor Stadium (1,932); Spartanburg, SC |
| February 11, 2026; 6:00 pm, ESPN+ | | at Samford | L 80–97 | 17–9 (9–4) | 15 – Watley | 9 – Machowski | 4 – Machowski | Pete Hanna Center (1,123); Homewood, AL |
| February 14, 2026; 5:00 pm, ESPN+ | | at UNC Greensboro | L 89–99 | 17–10 (9–5) | 24 – Machowski | 13 – Machowski | 3 – Machowski | Bodford Arena (1,242); Greensboro, NC |
| February 18, 2026; 6:00 pm, Nexstar/ESPN+ | | VMI | W 82–76 | 18–10 (10–5) | 22 – Holmes | 10 – Vasko | 7 – Vasko | Jerry Richardson Indoor Stadium (1,091); Spartanburg, SC |
| February 21, 2026; 7:00 pm, ESPN+ | | Furman | L 67–76 | 18–11 (10–6) | 20 – Holmes | 10 – Vasko | 3 – Tied | Jerry Richardson Indoor Stadium (3,181); Spartanburg, SC |
| February 25, 2026; 6:00 pm, ESPN+ | | at East Tennessee State | W 72–69 | 19–11 (11–6) | 20 – Machowski | 6 – Tied | 6 – Machowski | Freedom Hall Civic Center (5,306); Johnson City, TN |
| February 28, 2026; 2:00 pm, ESPN+ | | The Citadel | L 90–93 ^{OT} | 19–12 (11–7) | 30 – Machowski | 9 – Stirling | 4 – Tied | Jerry Richardson Indoor Stadium (1,356); Spartanburg, SC |
SoCon tournament
| March 7, 2026; 2:30 pm, ESPN+ | (2) | vs. (7) UNC Greensboro; Quarterfinals | L 72–75 | 19–13 | 24 – Holmes | 8 – Machowski | 9 – Vasko | Harrah's Cherokee Center (5,140); Asheville, NC |
*Non-conference game. ^{#}Rankings from AP Poll. (#) Tournament seedings in parentheses. All times are in Eastern.
