= 2025–26 East Tennessee State Buccaneers men's basketball team =

American college basketball season

2025–26 East Tennessee State Buccaneers men's basketball

SoCon regular season champions
- Conference: Southern Conference
- Record: 23–11 (13–5 SoCon)
- Head coach: Brooks Savage (3rd season)
- Assistant coaches: Kris Arkenberg; Marcus Belcher; Cory Dixon; Miles Lester; Blake Sexton
- Home arena: Freedom Hall Civic Center

2025–26 Southern Conference men's basketball standings
	Conf.				Overall
Team	W		L	PCT	W		L	PCT
East Tennessee State	13	–	5	.722	23	–	11	.676
Wofford	11	–	7	.611	19	–	13	.594
Samford	11	–	7	.611	18	–	14	.563
Mercer	11	–	7	.611	19	–	13	.594
Western Carolina	10	–	8	.556	15	–	16	.484
Furman †	10	–	8	.556	22	–	12	.647
UNC Greensboro	9	–	9	.500	15	–	19	.441
Chattanooga	7	–	11	.389	13	–	19	.406
The Citadel	7	–	11	.389	11	–	22	.333
VMI	1	–	17	.056	6	–	26	.188
† 2026 SoCon tournament winner As of March 9, 2026

The 2025–26 East Tennessee State Buccaneers men's basketball team represented East Tennessee State University during the 2025–26 NCAA Division I men's basketball season. The Buccaneers, led by third-year head coach Brooks Savage, played their home games at the Freedom Hall Civic Center in Johnson City, Tennessee, as members of the Southern Conference.

== Previous season ==
The Buccaneers finished the 2024–25 season 19–13, 12–6 in SoCon play, to finish in a tie for third place. They were upset by #6 seed and eventual tournament champions Wofford in the quarterfinals of the SoCon tournament.

== Preseason ==
On October 1, 2025, the SoCon released their preseason coaches poll. East Tennessee State was picked to finish fourth in the conference.

=== Preseason rankings ===
SoCon Preseason Poll
Place	Team	Points
1	Chattanooga	77 (5)
2	Furman	73 (5)
3	Samford	62
4	East Tennessee State	61
5	UNC Greensboro	43
6	VMI	41
7	Western Carolina	32
8	Mercer	30
9	Wofford	21
10	The Citadel	10
(#) first-place votes

=== Preseason All-SoCon Team ===
Preseason All-SoCon Team
Player	Year	Position
Jaylen Smith	Junior	Guard

== Roster ==
2025–26 East Tennessee State Buccaneers men's basketball team
Players
Coaches

Pos.	#	Name	Height	Weight	Year	Previous school	Hometown
G	2	Maki Johnson	6 ft 4 in (1.93 m)	186 lb (84 kg)	Jr	Huntington Prep	Huntington, West Virginia
G	3	Maddox Huff	6 ft 3 in (1.91 m)	190 lb (86 kg)	Fr	Harlan County High School	Baxter, Kentucky
G	4	Jaylen Smith	5 ft 11 in (1.8 m)	175 lb (79 kg)	Jr	North Florida	Ocoee, Florida
G	5	Allen Strothers	6 ft 1 in (1.85 m)	172 lb (78 kg)	RS Sr	Menchville High School	Newport News, Virginia
G	11	Brian Taylor II	6 ft 4 in (1.93 m)	175 lb (79 kg)	Sr	SIU Edwardsville	St. Louis, Missouri
F	13	Blake Barkley	6 ft 8 in (2.03 m)	220 lb (100 kg)	RS So	Northwestern	Morgantown, West Virginia
F	14	Brayden Crump	6 ft 8 in (2.03 m)	220 lb (100 kg)	RS So	Elon	Morganton, North Carolina
F	15	Cam Morris III	6 ft 8 in (2.03 m)	205 lb (93 kg)	GS	UMass Lowell	Alexander City, Alabama
G	21	Gabe Sisk	6 ft 5 in (1.96 m)	207 lb (94 kg)	Jr	Ballard High School	Louisville, Kentucky
G	23	Frederico Whitaker Jr.	5 ft 11 in (1.8 m)	135 lb (61 kg)	Fr	IMG Academy	Pittsboro, North Carolina
F	24	Isaiah Sutherland	6 ft 7 in (2.01 m)	215 lb (98 kg)	Jr	Orlando Christian Prep	Orlando, Florida
G	25	Joseph Carter	6 ft 1 in (1.85 m)	190 lb (86 kg)	Fr	Alcoa High School	Louisville, Tennessee
F	30	Henry Sisemore	6 ft 8 in (2.03 m)	195 lb (88 kg)	Fr	Lago Vista High School	Lago Vista, Texas
F	35	Jordan McCullum	6 ft 8 in (2.03 m)	180 lb (82 kg)	So	Murray State	Harriman, Tennessee
G	55	Milton Matthews III	6 ft 3 in (1.91 m)	200 lb (91 kg)	Sr	Florida A&M	District Heights, Maryland

Head coach

- Brooks Savage (Tennessee)

Assistant coach(es)

- Kris Arkenberg (IUPUI)
- Marcus Belcher (Southern Illinois)
- Cory Dixon (New Orleans)
- Miles Lester (Wake Forest)
- Blake Sexton (Tennessee)

Legend

- (C) Team captain
- (S) Suspended
- (I) Ineligible
- (W) Walk-on
- Injured
- Current redshirt

Roster
Last update: October 23, 2025

== Schedule and results ==
Date time, TV	Rank^{#}	Opponent^{#}	Result	Record	Site (attendance) city, state
Exhibition
October 29, 2025*; 7:00 pm		Wake Forest; Charity Exhibition	L 70–89		Freedom Hall Civic Center (6,392); Johnson City, TN
Non-conference regular season
November 4, 2025*; 7:00 pm, ESPN+		Converse	W 102–50	1–0	Freedom Hall Civic Center (1,378); Johnson City, TN
November 8, 2025*; 6:00 pm, ESPN+		at Presbyterian	L 64–68	1–1	Templeton Center (279); Clinton, SC
November 12, 2025*; 7:00 pm, ESPN+		Northern Kentucky	W 75–63	2–1	Freedom Hall Civic Center (2,307); Johnson City, TN
November 15, 2025*; 3:00 pm, ESPN+		at North Alabama; SoCon/ASUN Challenge	W 78–74	3–1	CB&S Bank Arena (2,256); Florence, AL
November 21, 2025*; 7:00 pm, ESPN+		Morehead State; ETSU MTE	W 77–62	4–1	Freedom Hall Civic Center; Johnson City, TN
November 23, 2025*; 4:00 pm, ESPN+		Louisiana–Monroe; ETSU MTE	W 97–55	5–1	Freedom Hall Civic Center (2,267); Johnson City, TN
November 29, 2025*; 4:00 pm, ESPN+		Central Arkansas; SoCon/ASUN Challenge	W 80–57	6–1	Freedom Hall Civic Center; Johnson City, TN
December 2, 2025*; 7:00 pm, ESPN+		at Dayton	L 71–88	6–2	UD Arena (13,407); Dayton, OH
December 5, 2025*; 7:00 pm, ESPN+		South Alabama	W 91–65	7–2	Freedom Hall Civic Center (2,473); Johnson City, TN
December 7, 2025*; 2:00 pm, ESPN+		Tusculum	W 78–62	8–2	Freedom Hall Civic Center (1,991); Johnson City, TN
December 12, 2025*; 8:00 pm, ESPN+		at Austin Peay	L 75–76	8–3	F&M Bank Arena (2,101); Clarksville, TN
December 16, 2025*; 8:00 pm, ACCN		at No. 12 North Carolina	L 58–77	8–4	Dean Smith Center (16,548); Chapel Hill, NC
December 20, 2025*; 4:00 pm, ESPN+		Jacksonville State	L 75–81	8–5	Freedom Hall Civic Center (2,270); Johnson City, TN
SoCon regular season
December 30, 2025; 6:00 pm, ESPN+		at The Citadel	W 74–49	9–5 (1–0)	McAlister Field House (1,109); Charleston, SC
January 3, 2026; 4:00 pm, ESPN+		Mercer	W 77–71	10–5 (2–0)	Freedom Hall Civic Center (3,122); Johnson City, TN
January 7, 2026; 7:00 pm, ESPN+		VMI	W 81–67	11–5 (3–0)	Freedom Hall Civic Center (3,074); Johnson City, TN
January 10, 2026; 4:00 pm, ESPN+		UNC Greensboro	W 86–60	12–5 (4–0)	Freedom Hall Civic Center (3,984); Johnson City, TN
January 14, 2026; 7:00 pm, ESPN+		at Western Carolina	L 68–72	12–6 (4–1)	Ramsey Center (1,498); Cullowhee, NC
January 17, 2026; 2:00 pm, CBSSN		at Samford	W 76–75	13–6 (5–1)	Pete Hanna Center (2,103); Homewood, AL
January 21, 2026; 7:00 pm, ESPNU		at Chattanooga	W 67–66	14–6 (6–1)	McKenzie Arena (4,611); Chattanooga, TN
January 24, 2026; 4:00 pm, ESPN+		The Citadel	W 84–55	15–6 (7–1)	Freedom Hall Civic Center (3,765); Johnson City, TN
January 29, 2026; 7:00 pm, ESPN+		Western Carolina	L 88–90	15–7 (7–2)	Freedom Hall Civic Center; Johnson City, TN
February 1, 2026; 7:00 pm, CBSSN		at Wofford	W 86–72	16–7 (8–2)	Jerry Richardson Indoor Stadium; Spartanburg, SC
February 4, 2026; 7:00 pm, ESPN+		Furman	W 75–71 ^{OT}	17–7 (9–2)	Freedom Hall Civic Center (4,072); Johnson City, TN
February 7, 2026; 1:00 pm, ESPN+		at VMI	W 87–70	18–7 (10–2)	Cameron Hall (1,433); Lexington, VA
February 11, 2026; 7:00 pm, CBSSN		Chattanooga	W 73–61	19–7 (11–2)	Freedom Hall Civic Center (4,854); Johnson City, TN
February 14, 2026; 12:00 pm, ESPNU		Samford	L 72–82 ^{OT}	19–8 (11–3)	Freedom Hall Civic Center (5,138); Johnson City, TN
February 18, 2026; 6:30 pm, ESPN+		at Furman	W 78–69	20–8 (12–3)	Timmons Arena (2,500); Greenville, SC
February 21, 2026; 4:00 pm, ESPN+		at UNC Greensboro	W 87–75	21–8 (13–3)	Bodford Arena (1,498); Greensboro, NC
February 25, 2026; 7:00 pm, ESPN+		Wofford	L 69–72	21–9 (13–4)	Freedom Hall Civic Center (5,306); Johnson City, TN
February 28, 2026; 4:30 pm, ESPN+		at Mercer	L 76–82	21–10 (13–5)	Hawkins Arena (2,317); Macon, GA
SoCon tournament
March 7, 2026; 12:00 pm, ESPN+	(1)	vs. (9) The Citadel; Quarterfinals	W 83–76	22–10	Harrah's Cherokee Center; Asheville, NC
March 8, 2026; 4:00 pm, ESPNU	(1)	vs. (5) Western Carolina; Semifinals	W 69–67	23–10	Harrah's Cherokee Center; Asheville, NC
March 9, 2026; 7:00 pm, ESPN	(1)	vs. (6) Furman; Championship	L 61–76	23–11	Harrah's Cherokee Center (6,111); Asheville, NC
*Non-conference game. ^{#}Rankings from AP Poll. (#) Tournament seedings in parentheses. All times are in Eastern.
