= 2025–26 Western Carolina Catamounts men's basketball team =

American college basketball season

2025–26 Western Carolina Catamounts men's basketball
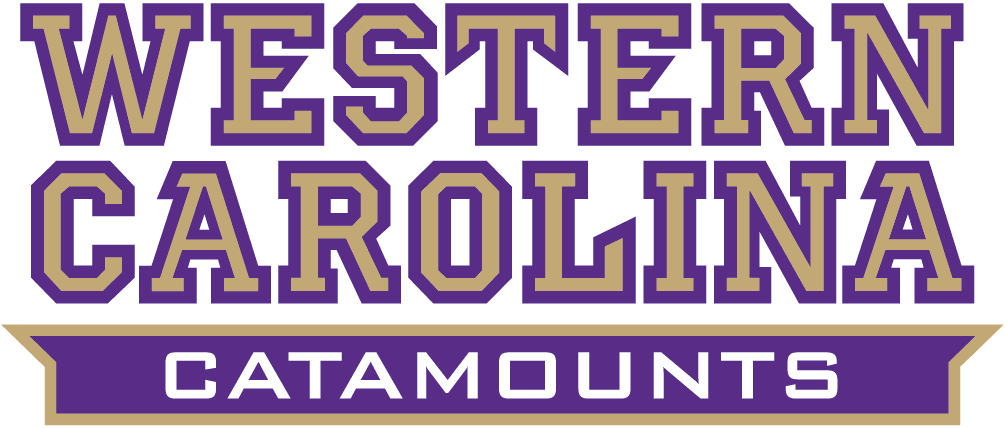
- Conference: Southern Conference
- Record: 15–16 (10–8 SoCon)
- Head coach: Tim Craft (2nd season)
- Associate head coach: Andre Gray
- Assistant coaches: Andrew Brown; Adam Bullard; Jackson Simmons
- Home arena: Ramsey Center

2025–26 Southern Conference men's basketball standings
	Conf.				Overall
Team	W		L	PCT	W		L	PCT
East Tennessee State	13	–	5	.722	23	–	10	.697
Wofford	11	–	7	.611	19	–	13	.594
Samford	11	–	7	.611	18	–	14	.563
Mercer	11	–	7	.611	19	–	13	.594
Furman	10	–	8	.556	21	–	12	.636
Western Carolina	10	–	8	.556	15	–	16	.484
UNC Greensboro	9	–	9	.500	15	–	19	.441
Chattanooga	7	–	11	.389	13	–	19	.406
The Citadel	7	–	11	.389	11	–	22	.333
VMI	1	–	17	.056	6	–	26	.188
† 2026 SoCon tournament winner As of March 8, 2026

The 2025–26 Western Carolina Catamounts men's basketball team represented Western Carolina University during the 2025–26 NCAA Division I men's basketball season. The Catamounts, led by second-year head coach Tim Craft, played their home games at the Ramsey Center in Cullowhee, North Carolina as members of the Southern Conference (SoCon).

== Previous season ==
The Catamounts finished the 2024–25 season 8–22, 4–14 in SoCon play, to finish in seventh place. They were defeated by Mercer in the first round of the SoCon tournament.

== Preseason ==
On October 1, 2025, the SoCon released their preseason coaches poll. Western Carolina was picked to finish seventh in the conference.

=== Preseason rankings ===
SoCon Preseason Poll
Place	Team	Points
1	Chattanooga	77 (5)
2	Furman	73 (5)
3	Samford	62
4	East Tennessee State	61
5	UNC Greensboro	43
6	VMI	41
7	Western Carolina	32
8	Mercer	30
9	Wofford	21
10	The Citadel	10
(#) first-place votes

=== Preseason All-SoCon Team ===
Preseason All-SoCon Team
Player	Year	Position
Marcus Kell	RS Junior	Forward

== Roster ==
2025–26 Western Carolina Catamounts men's basketball team
Players
Coaches

Pos.	#	Name	Height	Weight	Year	Previous school	Hometown
G	0	Cord Stansberry	6 ft 4 in (1.93 m)	180 lb (82 kg)	RS Jr	Pepperdine	Bermuda Dunes, California
F	1	Chase McKey	6 ft 10 in (2.08 m)	202 lb (92 kg)	RS Sr	Marshall	Atlanta, Georgia
G	2	CJ Hyland	6 ft 1 in (1.85 m)	175 lb (79 kg)	RS So	Loganville High School	Loganville, Georgia
G	3	Julien Soumaoro	5 ft 11 in (1.8 m)	175 lb (79 kg)	GS	East Carolina	Bronx, New York
G	4	Justin Johnson	6 ft 8 in (2.03 m)	200 lb (91 kg)	So	Arkansas State	Miami, Florida
G	5	Titian DeRosa	5 ft 9 in (1.75 m)	150 lb (68 kg)	Fr	Whitman High School	Bethesda, Maryland
C	7	Abdulai Fanta Kabba	7 ft 0 in (2.13 m)	235 lb (107 kg)	So	Denver	Kenema, Sierra Leone
G	8	Tahlan Pettway	6 ft 2 in (1.88 m)	165 lb (75 kg)	Fr	St. Thomas More School	Worcester, Massachusetts
G	11	Drew Hollifield	5 ft 11 in (1.8 m)	190 lb (86 kg)	RS Fr	Shelby High School	Shelby, North Carolina
F	12	Samuel Dada	6 ft 9 in (2.06 m)	225 lb (102 kg)	Fr	Link Academy	Lagos, Nigeria
G	17	Max Williams	6 ft 6 in (1.98 m)	180 lb (82 kg)	RS Fr	Hanover High School	Hanover, Virginia
G	20	Fischer Brown	6 ft 4 in (1.93 m)	180 lb (82 kg)	So	Wasatch Academy	Lewistown, Montana
F	21	Tayeshaun Smith	6 ft 7 in (2.01 m)	220 lb (100 kg)	Fr	Combine Academy	Raleigh, North Carolina
G	22	Tidjiane Dioumassi	6 ft 4 in (1.93 m)	200 lb (91 kg)	GS	Southern	Paris, France
F	23	Marcus Kell	6 ft 8 in (2.03 m)	213 lb (97 kg)	RS Jr	Legion Collegiate Academy	Fort Mill, South Carolina
F	33	Vernon Collins	6 ft 10 in (2.08 m)	224 lb (102 kg)	Sr	Princeton	Chocowinity, North Carolina

Head coach

- Tim Craft (Florida)

Assistant coach(es)

- Andre Gray (Methodist)
- Andrew Brown (Mercer)
- Adam Bullard (Western Carolina)
- Jackson Simmons (Charlotte)

Legend

- (C) Team captain
- (S) Suspended
- (I) Ineligible
- (W) Walk-on
- Injured
- Current redshirt

Roster
Last update: October 26, 2025

== Schedule and results ==
Date time, TV	Rank^{#}	Opponent^{#}	Result	Record	Site (attendance) city, state
Exhibition
October 29, 2025*; 7:00 pm		Brevard	W 87–32		Ramsey Center; Cullowhee, NC
Non-conference regular season
November 3, 2025*; 7:00 pm, ESPN+		at Cincinnati	L 63–94	0–1	Fifth Third Arena (9,126); Cincinnati, OH
November 8, 2025*; 1:30 pm, The CW		at No. 6 Duke	L 54–95	0–2	Cameron Indoor Stadium (9,314); Durham, NC
November 13, 2025*; 7:00 pm, ESPN+		Voorhees	W 95–44	1–2	Ramsey Center (854); Cullowhee, NC
November 16, 2025*; 1:00 pm, Nexstar/ESPN+		Stetson; ASUN/SoCon Challenge	W 76–65	2–2	Ramsey Center (1,698); Cullowhee, NC
November 19, 2025*; 7:30 pm, ESPN+		UNC Asheville	W 80–73	3–2	Ramsey Center (2,387); Cullowhee, NC
November 22, 2025*; 5:00 pm, ESPN+		at Lipscomb; ASUN/SoCon Challenge	L 62–83	3–3	Allen Arena (1,194); Nashville, TN
November 29, 2025*; 2:00 pm, ESPN+		at High Point	L 73–93	3–4	Qubein Center (2,719); High Point, NC
December 2, 2025*; 11:00 am, ESPN+		Virginia Lynchburg	W 124–62	4–4	Ramsey Center (2,604); Cullowhee, NC
December 6, 2025*; 2:00 pm, ESPN+		at USC Upstate	L 67–78	4–5	G. B. Hodge Center (419); Spartanburg, SC
December 11, 2025*; 7:00 pm, ACCNX		at Virginia Tech	L 74–96	4–6	Cassell Coliseum; Blacksburg, VA
December 18, 2025*; 7:00 pm, SECN+		at No. 25 Georgia	L 82–112	4–7	Stegeman Coliseum (6,652); Athens, GA
SoCon regular season
December 31, 2025; 1:00 pm, ESPN+		Wofford	L 74–79	4–8 (0–1)	Ramsey Center (1,484); Cullowhee, NC
January 3, 2026; 4:00 pm, ESPN+		at Furman	W 80–77 ^{OT}	5–8 (1–1)	Timmons Arena (2,500); Greenville, SC
January 7, 2026; 7:00 pm, ESPN+		at Samford	L 77–82	5–9 (1–2)	Pete Hanna Center (813); Homewood, AL
January 10, 2026; 1:00 pm, ESPN+		at The Citadel	L 77–79 ^{OT}	5–10 (1–3)	McAlister Field House (1,201); Charleston, SC
January 14, 2026; 6:00 pm, Nexstar/ESPN+		East Tennessee State	W 72–68	6–10 (2–3)	Ramsey Center (1,498); Cullowhee, NC
January 17, 2026; 1:00 pm, ESPN+		Chattanooga	L 82–90	6–11 (2–4)	Ramsey Center (1,780); Cullowhee, NC
January 21, 2026; 7:00 pm, ESPN+		at Mercer	L 76–88	6–12 (2–5)	Hawkins Arena (1,084); Macon, GA
January 24, 2026; 3:30 pm, ESPN+		VMI	W 88–58	7–12 (3–5)	Ramsey Center (1,418); Cullowhee, NC
January 29, 2026; 7:00 pm, ESPN+		at East Tennessee State	W 90–88	8–12 (4–5)	Freedom Hall Civic Center (4,012); Johnson City, TN
January 31, 2026; 1:00 pm, ESPN+		Samford	L 74–88	8–13 (4–6)	Ramsey Center (1,146); Cullowhee, NC
February 4, 2026; 6:00 pm, ESPN+		at UNC Greensboro	L 78–81	8–14 (4–7)	Bodford Arena (1,204); Greensboro, NC
February 7, 2026; 4:00 pm, ESPN+		at Wofford	L 66–77	8–15 (4–8)	Jerry Richardson Indoor Stadium (1,932); Spartanburg, SC
February 11, 2026; 6:00 pm, Nexstar/ESPN+		The Citadel	W 87–49	9–15 (5–8)	Ramsey Center (1,041); Cullowhee, NC
February 14, 2026; 4:30 pm, ESPN+		at Chattanooga	W 81–76	10–15 (6–8)	McKenzie Arena (3,347); Chattanooga, TN
February 18, 2026; 7:00 pm, ESPN+		UNC Greensboro	W 91–77	11–15 (7–8)	Ramsey Center (1,692); Cullowhee, NC
February 21, 2026; 1:00 pm, ESPN+		at VMI	W 81–62	12–15 (8–8)	Cameron Hall (2,284); Lexington, VA
February 25, 2026; 7:00 pm, ESPN+		Mercer	W 78–74	13–15 (9–8)	Ramsey Center (1,970); Cullowhee, NC
February 28, 2026; 5:30 pm, ESPN+		Furman	W 86–67	14–15 (10–8)	Ramsey Center (3,486); Cullowhee, NC
SoCon tournament
March 7, 2026; 8:30 pm, ESPN+	(5)	vs. (4) Mercer; Quarterfinals	W 77–73	15–15	Harrah's Cherokee Center (4,768); Asheville, NC
March 8, 2026; 4:00 pm, ESPNU	(5)	vs. (1) East Tennessee State; Semifinals	L 67–69	15–16	Harrah's Cherokee Center; Asheville, NC
*Non-conference game. ^{#}Rankings from AP Poll. (#) Tournament seedings in parentheses. All times are in Eastern.
