= 2025–26 Furman Paladins men's basketball team =

American college basketball season

2025–26 Furman Paladins men's basketball

SoCon tournament champions

NCAA tournament, First round
- Conference: Southern Conference
- Record: 22–13 (10–8 SoCon)
- Head coach: Bob Richey (9th season)
- Associate head coach: Pat Estepp
- Assistant coaches: Klint Carlson; Kotie Kimble; Joe Pierre III; Rett Lister
- Home arena: Timmons Arena

2025–26 Southern Conference men's basketball standings
| | Conf. | | | | Overall |
| Team | W | | L | PCT | W | | L | PCT |
|---|---|---|---|---|---|---|---|---|
| East Tennessee State | 13 | – | 5 | .722 | 23 | – | 11 | .676 |
| Wofford | 11 | – | 7 | .611 | 19 | – | 13 | .594 |
| Samford | 11 | – | 7 | .611 | 18 | – | 14 | .563 |
| Mercer | 11 | – | 7 | .611 | 19 | – | 13 | .594 |
| Western Carolina | 10 | – | 8 | .556 | 15 | – | 16 | .484 |
| Furman † | 10 | – | 8 | .556 | 22 | – | 13 | .629 |
| UNC Greensboro | 9 | – | 9 | .500 | 15 | – | 19 | .441 |
| Chattanooga | 7 | – | 11 | .389 | 13 | – | 19 | .406 |
| The Citadel | 7 | – | 11 | .389 | 11 | – | 22 | .333 |
| VMI | 1 | – | 17 | .056 | 6 | – | 26 | .188 |
† 2026 SoCon tournament winner

The 2025–26 Furman Paladins men's basketball team represented Furman University during the 2025–26 NCAA Division I men's basketball season. The Paladins, led by ninth-year head coach Bob Richey, played their home games at Timmons Arena in Greenville, South Carolina as members of the Southern Conference (SoCon).

== Previous season ==
The Paladins finished the 2024–25 season 25–10, 11–7 in SoCon play, to finish in fifth place. They defeated Samford and top-seeded Chattanooga, before falling to Wofford in the SoCon tournament championship game. They received an invitation to the NIT, where they were defeated by North Texas in the first round.

== Preseason ==
On October 1, 2025, the SoCon released their preseason coaches poll. Furman was picked to finish second in the conference, while receiving five first-place votes.

=== Preseason rankings ===
SoCon Preseason Poll
| Place | Team | Points |
|---|---|---|
| 1 | Chattanooga | 77 (5) |
| 2 | Furman | 73 (5) |
| 3 | Samford | 62 |
| 4 | East Tennessee State | 61 |
| 5 | UNC Greensboro | 43 |
| 6 | VMI | 41 |
| 7 | Western Carolina | 32 |
| 8 | Mercer | 30 |
| 9 | Wofford | 21 |
| 10 | The Citadel | 10 |
(#) first-place votes

=== Preseason All-SoCon Team ===
Preseason All-SoCon Team
| Player | Year | Position |
|---|---|---|
| Cooper Bowser | Junior | Forward |
| Tom House | Senior | Guard |

== Roster ==
2025–26 Furman Paladins men's basketball team
Players
Coaches

| Pos. | # | Name | Height | Weight | Year | Previous school | Hometown |
|---|---|---|---|---|---|---|---|
| G | 0 | Abijah Franklin | 6 ft 5 in (1.96 m) | 180 lb (82 kg) | Fr | Wren High School | Greenville, SC |
| F | 1 | Charles Johnston | 6 ft 11 in (2.11 m) | 225 lb (102 kg) | Sr | Cal State Monterey Bay | Sydney, Australia |
| G | 2 | Eddrin Bronson | 6 ft 4 in (1.93 m) | 184 lb (83 kg) | RS So | Tampa Catholic High School | Tampa, FL |
| G | 3 | Asa Thomas | 6 ft 7 in (2.01 m) | 200 lb (91 kg) | RS So | Clemson | Lake Forest, IL |
| F | 4 | Ben Vander Wal | 6 ft 7 in (2.01 m) | 220 lb (100 kg) | Sr | Timothy Christian School | Elmhurst, IL |
| F | 5 | Mason Smith | 6 ft 7 in (2.01 m) | 200 lb (91 kg) | So | Davidson Day School | Huntersville, NC |
| G | 6 | Cole Bowser | 6 ft 6 in (1.98 m) | 200 lb (91 kg) | Fr | DeMatha Catholic High School | Bowie, MD |
| G | 8 | Collin O'Neal | 6 ft 4 in (1.93 m) | 200 lb (91 kg) | Fr | Montgomery Bell Academy | Nashville, TN |
| G | 10 | Alex Wilkins | 6 ft 5 in (1.96 m) | 175 lb (79 kg) | Fr | Brooks School | Mattapan, MA |
| G | 11 | Gunnar Lewis | 5 ft 10 in (1.78 m) | 165 lb (75 kg) | Fr | Christ Presbyterian Academy | Cottontown, TN |
| G | 12 | Tom House | 6 ft 7 in (2.01 m) | 200 lb (91 kg) | Sr | Florida State | Dayton, OH |
| F | 15 | Owen Ritger | 6 ft 9 in (2.06 m) | 218 lb (99 kg) | Fr | Marist School | Atlanta, GA |
| F | 21 | Cooper Bowser | 6 ft 11 in (2.11 m) | 215 lb (98 kg) | Jr | Sunrise Christian Academy | Woodbridge, VA |
| F | 30 | Thomas Tillman | 6 ft 6 in (1.98 m) | 200 lb (91 kg) | Sr | Charleston Charter School For Math & Science | Charleston, SC |
| F | 77 | Davis Molnar | 6 ft 6 in (1.98 m) | 215 lb (98 kg) | RS Jr | Terry Sanford High School | Fayetteville, NC |

Head coach

- Bob Richey (North Greenville)

Assistant coach(es)

- Pat Estepp (Cedarville)
- Klint Carlson (Northern Iowa)
- Kotie Kimble (Coastal Carolina)
- Joe Pierre III (Oklahoma State)
- Rett Lister (Furman)

Legend

- (C) Team captain
- (S) Suspended
- (I) Ineligible
- (W) Walk-on
- Injured
- Current redshirt

Roster
Last update: October 24, 2025

== Schedule and results ==
| Date time, TV | Rank^{#} | Opponent^{#} | Result | Record | Site (attendance) city, state |
Exhibition
| October 26, 2025*; 3:00 p.m., ESPN+ | | No. 15 Alabama | L 71–96 | – | Timmons Arena (2,750); Greenville, SC |
Non-conference regular season
| November 3, 2025*; 6:30 p.m. | | vs. High Point; Field of 68 Opening Day Marathon | L 71–97 | 0–1 | Rock Hill Sports & Events Center (473); Rock Hill, SC |
| November 7, 2025*; 7:00 p.m., ESPN+ | | Troy | L 61–64 | 0–2 | Timmons Arena (2,207); Greenville, SC |
| November 10, 2025*; 6:30 p.m., ESPN+ | | Columbia International | W 89–59 | 1–2 | Timmons Arena (1,967); Greenville, SC |
| November 14, 2025*; 7:00 p.m., ESPN+ | | at Northern Iowa | L 54–70 | 1–3 | McLeod Center (3,585); Cedar Falls, IA |
| November 19, 2025*; 6:30 p.m., ESPN+ | | Ohio Christian | W 79–44 | 2–3 | Timmons Arena (1,767); Greenville, SC |
| November 23, 2025*; 5:00 p.m., ESPN+ | | Queens; SoCon/ASUN Challenge | W 90–79 | 3–3 | Timmons Arena (2,167); Greenville, SC |
| November 27, 2025*; 11:00 a.m., ESPN2 | | vs. Richmond; ESPN Events Invitational Imagination bracket semifinals | W 73–72 | 4–3 | State Farm Field House; Bay Lake, FL |
| November 28, 2025*; 3:00 p.m., ESPN2 | | vs. Illinois State; ESPN Events Invitational Imagination bracket championship | L 65–72 | 4–4 | State Farm Field House (502); Bay Lake, FL |
| December 3, 2025*; 7:00 p.m., FloCollege | | at Elon | W 97–88 | 5–4 | Schar Center (1,468); Elon, NC |
| December 6, 2025*; 2:00 p.m., ESPN+ | | Harvard | W 79–69 | 6–4 | Timmons Arena (2,187); Greenville, SC |
| December 9, 2025*; 6:30 p.m., ESPN+ | | Bob Jones | W 105–57 | 7–4 | Timmons Arena (1,737); Greenville, SC |
| December 18, 2025*; 7:00 p.m., ESPN+ | | at Manhattan | W 75–68 | 8–4 | Draddy Gymnasium (576); Riverdale, NY |
| December 21, 2025*; 2:00 p.m., ESPN+ | | Charleston Southern | W 84–76 | 9–4 | Timmons Arena (1,867); Greenville, SC |
SoCon regular season
| December 31, 2025; 12:00 p.m., ESPN+ | | Mercer | W 74–72 | 10–4 (1–0) | Timmons Arena (2,117); Greenville, SC |
| January 3, 2026; 4:00 p.m., ESPN+ | | Western Carolina | L 77–80 ^{OT} | 10–5 (1–1) | Timmons Arena (2,500); Greenville, SC |
| January 7, 2026; 5:00 p.m., CBSSN | | at Chattanooga | W 78–67 | 11–5 (2–1) | McKenzie Arena (3,487); Chattanooga, TN |
| January 10, 2026; 2:00 p.m., ESPN+ | | VMI | W 69–48 | 12–5 (3–1) | Timmons Arena (2,447); Greenville, SC |
| January 14, 2026; 7:00 p.m., ESPN+ | | at Samford | W 77–73 | 13–5 (4–1) | Pete Hanna Center (1,833); Homewood, AL |
| January 17, 2026; 5:00 p.m., ESPN+ | | Wofford | L 70–74 | 13–6 (4–2) | Timmons Arena (2,500); Greenville, SC |
| January 21, 2026; 7:00 p.m., ESPN+ | | at The Citadel | L 75–77 ^{OT} | 13–7 (4–3) | McAlister Field House (1,433); Charleston, SC |
| January 23, 2026; 5:00 p.m., ESPN+ | | at UNC Greensboro | W 89–66 | 14–7 (5–3) | Bodford Arena (814); Greensboro, NC |
| January 29, 2026; 5:00 p.m., CBSSN | | Samford | W 78–73 | 15–7 (6–3) | Timmons Arena (2,037); Greenville, SC |
| February 1, 2026; 1:00 p.m., ESPN2 | | Chattanooga | W 75–70 | 16–7 (7–3) | Timmons Arena (1,000); Greenville, SC |
| February 4, 2026; 7:00 p.m., ESPN+ | | at East Tennessee State | L 71–75 ^{OT} | 16–8 (7–4) | Freedom Hall Civic Center (4,072); Johnson City, TN |
| February 8, 2026; 1:00 p.m., ESPN2 | | UNC Greensboro | L 64–67 | 16–9 (7–5) | Timmons Arena (2,497); Greenville, SC |
| February 11, 2026; 7:00 p.m., ESPN+ | | at Mercer | L 64–69 | 16–10 (7–6) | Hawkins Arena; Macon, GA |
| February 14, 2026; 1:00 p.m., ESPN+ | | at VMI | W 90–72 | 17–10 (8–6) | Cameron Hall (2,233); Lexington, VA |
| February 18, 2026; 6:30 p.m., ESPN+ | | East Tennessee State | L 69–78 | 17–11 (8–7) | Timmons Arena (2,500); Greenville, SC |
| February 21, 2026; 7:00 p.m., ESPN+ | | at Wofford | W 76–67 | 18–11 (9–7) | Jerry Richardson Indoor Stadium (3,181); Spartanburg, SC |
| February 25, 2026; 6:30 p.m., ESPN+ | | The Citadel | W 72–51 | 19–11 (10–7) | Timmons Arena (2,500); Greenville, SC |
| February 28, 2026; 5:30 p.m., ESPN+ | | at Western Carolina | L 67–86 | 19–12 (10–8) | Ramsey Center (3,486); Cullowhee, NC |
SoCon tournament
| March 7, 2026; 6:00 p.m., ESPN+ | (6) | vs. (3) Samford; Quarterfinal | W 86–81 | 20–12 | Harrah's Cherokee Center; Asheville, NC |
| March 8, 2026; 6:30 p.m., ESPNU | (6) | vs. (7) UNC Greensboro; Semifinal | W 81–75 | 21–12 | Harrah's Cherokee Center (5,285); Asheville, NC |
| March 9, 2026; 7:00 p.m., ESPN | (6) | vs. (1) East Tennessee State; Championship | W 76–61 | 22–12 | Harrah's Cherokee Center; Asheville, NC |
NCAA tournament
| March 20, 2025*; 10:25 p.m., TBS | (15 E) | vs. (2 E) No. 7 UConn; First round | L 71–82 | 22–13 | Xfinity Mobile Arena (19,636); Philadelphia, PA |
*Non-conference game. ^{#}Rankings from AP poll. (#) Tournament seedings in parentheses. E=East. All times are in Eastern.
