= 2025–26 Chattanooga Mocs men's basketball team =

American college basketball season

2025–26 Chattanooga Mocs men's basketball
- Conference: Southern Conference
- Record: 13–19 (7–11 SoCon)
- Head coach: Dan Earl (4th season)
- Associate head coach: Ander Galfsky; Scott Greenman
- Assistant coaches: Ricardo Rush Jr.; Logan Dahms; Alan Treakle
- Home arena: McKenzie Arena

2025–26 Southern Conference men's basketball standings
	Conf.				Overall
Team	W		L	PCT	W		L	PCT
East Tennessee State	13	–	5	.722	21	–	10	.677
Mercer	11	–	7	.611	19	–	12	.613
Wofford	11	–	7	.611	19	–	12	.613
Samford	11	–	7	.611	18	–	13	.581
Furman	10	–	8	.556	19	–	12	.613
Western Carolina	10	–	8	.556	14	–	15	.483
UNC Greensboro	9	–	9	.500	14	–	18	.438
Chattanooga	7	–	11	.389	13	–	19	.406
The Citadel	7	–	11	.389	11	–	21	.344
VMI	1	–	17	.056	6	–	26	.188
† 2026 SoCon tournament winner As of March 6, 2026

The 2025–26 Chattanooga Mocs men's basketball team represented the University of Tennessee at Chattanooga during the 2025–26 NCAA Division I men's basketball season. The Mocs were led by fourth-year head coach Dan Earl and played their home games at McKenzie Arena in Chattanooga, Tennessee as a member of the Southern Conference (SoCon).

== Previous season ==
The Mocs finished the 2024–25 season 29–9, 15–3 in SoCon play, to finish as SoCon regular season champions. They defeated Mercer in the quarterfinals of the SoCon tournament, before being upset by #5 seed Furman in the semifinals. They received an invitation to the NIT, where they would defeat Middle Tennessee, Dayton, Bradley, Loyola Chicago, and UC Irvine to win their first ever NIT championship.

== Preseason ==
On October 1, 2025, the SoCon released their preseason coaches poll. Chattanooga was picked to finish atop the conference, while receiving five first-place votes.

=== Preseason rankings ===
SoCon Preseason Poll
Place	Team	Points
1	Chattanooga	77 (5)
2	Furman	73 (5)
3	Samford	62
4	East Tennessee State	61
5	UNC Greensboro	43
6	VMI	41
7	Western Carolina	32
8	Mercer	30
9	Wofford	21
10	The Citadel	10
(#) first-place votes

=== Preseason All-SoCon Team ===
Preseason All-SoCon Team
Player	Year	Position
Jikari Johnson	Graduate Student	Guard
Collin Mulholland	RS Sophomore	Forward
Teddy Washington Jr.	Graduate Student	Guard

== Roster ==
2025–26 Chattanooga Mocs men's basketball team
Players
Coaches

Pos.	#	Name	Height	Weight	Year	Previous school	Hometown
G	0	Tate Darner	6 ft 4 in (1.93 m)	180 lb (82 kg)	Fr	Santa Fe Catholic High School	Lakeland, Florida
G	1	Brennan Watkins	6 ft 0 in (1.83 m)	180 lb (82 kg)	Sr	North Dakota State	Kearney, Missouri
G	2	Sebastian Hartmann	6 ft 6 in (1.98 m)	215 lb (98 kg)	Jr	Eastern Washington	Munich, Germany
G	3	Jikari Johnson	6 ft 4 in (1.93 m)	170 lb (77 kg)	GS	Trevecca Nazarene	Durham, North Carolina
G	4	Zach Bleshoy	6 ft 4 in (1.93 m)	195 lb (88 kg)	Fr	Pope High School	Marietta, Georgia
G	5	Jordan Frison	6 ft 0 in (1.83 m)	170 lb (77 kg)	Jr	Pittsburg State	Memphis, Tennessee
G	6	Ryan Lopez	5 ft 8 in (1.73 m)	175 lb (79 kg)	Jr	Boyd-Buchanan School	Ooltewah, Tennessee
G/F	7	Sean Cusano	6 ft 9 in (2.06 m)	215 lb (98 kg)	Jr	Hilton Head Prep	Hilton Head, South Carolina
G	10	Teddy Washington Jr.	6 ft 2 in (1.88 m)	175 lb (79 kg)	GS	Southeast Missouri State	Blytheville, Arkansas
G	11	Billy Smith	6 ft 7 in (2.01 m)	210 lb (95 kg)	Sr	Bellarmine	Indianapolis, Indiana
G	13	Houston Holland	6 ft 3 in (1.91 m)	195 lb (88 kg)	So	Silverdale Baptist Academy	Chattanooga, Tennessee
G/F	20	Liam Vitters	6 ft 5 in (1.96 m)	220 lb (100 kg)	So	The Kiski School	Arlington, Virginia
F/C	21	Collin Mulholland	6 ft 11 in (2.11 m)	235 lb (107 kg)	RS So	Holy Family Catholic High School	Kitchener, Ontario
F	23	Latif Diouf	6 ft 9 in (2.06 m)	245 lb (111 kg)	So	Dunn School	Gouda, Netherlands
F/C	30	Josh Bowman	6 ft 9 in (2.06 m)	220 lb (100 kg)	Fr	Huntsville High School	Huntsville, Alabama
C	34	Makai Richards	6 ft 10 in (2.08 m)	235 lb (107 kg)	RS Sr	Pacific	Oak Park, California
G	55	Parker Robison	6 ft 0 in (1.83 m)	180 lb (82 kg)	So	The McCallie School	Chattanooga, Tennessee

Head coach

- Dan Earl (Penn State)

Assistant coach(es)

- Ander Galfsky (Birmingham–Southern)
- Scott Greenman (Princeton)
- Ricardo Rush Jr. (Maryland)
- Logan Dahms (Texas A&M)
- Alan Treakle (Mount Olive)

Legend

- (C) Team captain
- (S) Suspended
- (I) Ineligible
- (W) Walk-on
- Injured
- Current redshirt

Roster
Last update: October 23, 2025

== Schedule and results ==
Date time, TV	Rank^{#}	Opponent^{#}	Result	Record	Site (attendance) city, state
Non-conference regular season
November 3, 2025*; 7:00 pm, ESPN+		Union (KY)	W 92–39	1–0	McKenzie Arena (3,612); Chattanooga, TN
November 7, 2025*; 10:30 pm, ESPN+		at Saint Mary's	L 66–87	1–1	University Credit Union Pavilion (3,381); Moraga, CA
November 8, 2025*; 9:00 pm, MW Network		at UNLV	L 69–101	1–2	Thomas & Mack Center (4,896); Paradise, NV
November 15, 2025*; 1:00 pm, ESPN+		at Florida Gulf Coast; SoCon/ASUN Challenge	L 73–91	1–3	Alico Arena (1,572); Fort Myers, FL
November 19, 2025*; 7:00 pm, ESPN+		at South Carolina State	W 78–66	2–3	SHM Memorial Center (200); Orangeburg, SC
November 22, 2025*; 4:30 pm, ESPN+		North Alabama; SoCon/ASUN Challenge	W 71–57	3–3	McKenzie Arena (3,455); Chattanooga, TN
November 28, 2025*; 2:00 pm, ESPN+		Tennessee Wesleyan; Coke Zero Sugar Classic	W 109–59	4–3	McKenzie Arena (2,903); Chattanooga, TN
November 30, 2025*; 2:00 pm, ESPN+		Tennessee State; Coke Zero Sugar Classic	L 64–70	4–4	McKenzie Arena (2,957); Chattanooga, TN
December 6, 2025*; 2:00 pm, Nexstar		Southeast Missouri State	L 70–74	4–5	McKenzie Arena (3,055); Chattanooga, TN
December 9, 2025*; 7:00 pm, ESPN+		Oakwood	W 103–46	5–5	McKenzie Arena (2,729); Chattanooga, TN
December 13, 2025*; 4:30 pm, SECN		vs. No. 21 Auburn; Holiday Hoopsgiving	L 78–92	5–6	State Farm Arena (1,200); Atlanta, GA
December 17, 2025*; 7:00 pm, ESPN+		at Bellarmine	L 64–79	5–7	Knights Hall (1,192); Louisville, KY
December 21, 2025*; 8:00 pm		at Alabama A&M	W 73–66	6–7	AAMU Event Center (388); Huntsville, AL
SoCon regular season
January 1, 2026; 4:00 pm, ESPN+		at UNC Greensboro	L 72–77	6–8 (0–1)	Bodford Arena (435); Greensboro, NC
January 3, 2026; 1:00 pm, ESPN+		at VMI	L 71–79	6–9 (0–2)	Cameron Hall (965); Lexington, VA
January 7, 2026; 5:00 pm, CBSSN		Furman	L 67–78	6–10 (0–3)	McKenzie Arena (3,487); Chattanooga, TN
January 10, 2026; 4:30 pm, Nexstar/ESPN+		Samford	W 88–79	7–10 (1–3)	McKenzie Arena (4,312); Chattanooga, TN
January 14, 2026; 6:00 pm, ESPN+		at Wofford	W 76–67	8–10 (2–3)	Jerry Richardson Indoor Stadium (1,231); Spartanburg, SC
January 17, 2026; 1:00 pm, ESPN+		at Western Carolina	W 90–82	9–10 (3–3)	Ramsey Center (1,780); Cullowhee, NC
January 21, 2026; 8:00 pm, ESPNU		East Tennessee State	L 66–67	9–11 (3–4)	McKenzie Arena (4,611); Chattanooga, TN
January 24, 2026; 2:00 pm, ESPNews		at Samford	L 64–75	9–12 (3–5)	Pete Hanna Center (1,533); Homewood, AL
January 29, 2026; 6:00 pm, ESPN+		Wofford	L 55–81	9–13 (3–6)	McKenzie Arena (3,378); Chattanooga, TN
February 1, 2026; 1:00 pm, ESPN2		at Furman	L 70–75	9–14 (3–7)	Timmons Arena (1,000); Greenville, SC
February 5, 2026; 7:00 pm, ESPN+		Mercer	W 79–75	10–14 (4–7)	McKenzie Arena (3,183); Chattanooga, TN
February 7, 2026; 2:00 pm, ESPN+		The Citadel	L 71–78	10–15 (4–8)	McKenzie Arena (3,750); Chattanooga, TN
February 11, 2026; 7:00 pm, CBSSN		at East Tennessee State	L 61–73	10–16 (4–9)	Freedom Hall Civic Center (4,854); Johnson City, TN
February 14, 2026; 4:30 pm, ESPN+		Western Carolina	L 76–81	10–17 (4–10)	McKenzie Arena (3,347); Chattanooga, TN
February 19, 2026; 7:00 pm, ESPN+		at Mercer	W 94–90	11–17 (5–10)	Hawkins Arena (1,292); Macon, GA
February 21, 2026; 1:00 pm, ESPN+		at The Citadel	W 93–72	12–17 (6–10)	McAlister Field House (1,227); Charleston, SC
February 26, 2026; 7:00 pm, ESPN+		UNC Greensboro	L 80–85	12–18 (6–11)	McKenzie Arena (4,164); Chattanooga, TN
February 28, 2026; 2:00 pm, ESPN+		VMI	W 86–79	13–18 (7–11)	McKenzie Arena (3,824); Chattanooga, TN
SoCon tournament
March 6, 2026; 5:00 pm, ESPN+	(8)	vs. (9) The Citadel; First round	L 85–88	13–19	Harrah's Cherokee Center; Asheville, NC
*Non-conference game. ^{#}Rankings from AP Poll. (#) Tournament seedings in parentheses. All times are in Eastern.
