= 2025–26 The Citadel Bulldogs basketball team =

American college basketball season

2025–26 The Citadel Bulldogs basketball
- Conference: Southern Conference
- Record: 11–22 (7–11 SoCon)
- Head coach: Ed Conroy (4th season, 8th overall)
- Assistant coaches: Cameron Wells; Del Harris; Andrew Glover; Brady Schuck
- Home arena: McAlister Field House

2025–26 Southern Conference men's basketball standings
	Conf.				Overall
Team	W		L	PCT	W		L	PCT
East Tennessee State	13	–	5	.722	21	–	10	.677
Wofford	11	–	7	.611	19	–	12	.613
Samford	11	–	7	.611	18	–	13	.581
Mercer	11	–	7	.611	19	–	12	.613
Furman	10	–	8	.556	19	–	12	.613
Western Carolina	10	–	8	.556	14	–	15	.483
UNC Greensboro	9	–	9	.500	14	–	18	.438
Chattanooga	7	–	11	.389	13	–	19	.406
The Citadel	7	–	11	.389	11	–	21	.344
VMI	1	–	17	.056	6	–	26	.188
† 2026 SoCon tournament winner As of March 6, 2026

The 2025–26 The Citadel Bulldogs basketball team represented The Citadel during the 2025–26 NCAA Division I men's basketball season. The Bulldogs were led by head coach Ed Conroy in the fourth season of his second stint with the team, and his eighth season overall. They play their home games at McAlister Field House in Charleston, South Carolina as members of the Southern Conference (SoCon).

The Bulldogs finished 11–22 overall and tied for 8th place in the SoCon with a 7–11 record. They won their opening round game in the SoCon Tournament, but fell to top-seeded ETSU in the quarterfinals.

== Previous season ==
The Bulldogs finished the 2024–25 season 5–25, 0–18 in SoCon play, to finish in tenth (last) place. They were defeated by VMI in the first round of the SoCon tournament.

== Preseason ==
On October 1, 2025, the SoCon released their preseason coaches poll. The Citadel was picked to finish last in the conference.

=== Preseason rankings ===
SoCon Preseason Poll
Place	Team	Points
1	Chattanooga	77 (5)
2	Furman	73 (5)
3	Samford	62
4	East Tennessee State	61
5	UNC Greensboro	43
6	VMI	41
7	Western Carolina	32
8	Mercer	30
9	Wofford	21
10	The Citadel	10
(#) first-place votes

=== Preseason All-SoCon Team ===
No players were named the Preseason All-SoCon Team.

== Roster ==
2025–26 The Citadel Bulldogs men's basketball team
Players
Coaches

Pos.	#	Name	Height	Weight	Year	Previous school	Hometown
F	1	Christian Moore	6 ft 6 in (1.98 m)	225 lb (102 kg)	So	Avon Old Farms	Los Angeles, California
G	2	Jameson Heck	5 ft 7 in (1.7 m)	170 lb (77 kg)	Fr	St. Francis de Sales School	Waterville, Ohio
G	3	Marcos Gonzales	6 ft 3 in (1.91 m)	180 lb (82 kg)	Fr	Brother Rice High School	Chicago, Illinois
G	4	Logan Applegate	6 ft 2 in (1.88 m)	185 lb (84 kg)	Sr	Drury	Nevada, Missouri
G	5	Eze Wali	6 ft 1 in (1.85 m)	185 lb (84 kg)	So	Pomfret School	Providence, Rhode Island
G	7	Gabe Hernandez	5 ft 11 in (1.8 m)	180 lb (82 kg)	Jr	Barry	Doral, Florida
F	8	Sola Adebisi	6 ft 7 in (2.01 m)	205 lb (93 kg)	Sr	Florida State	Alpharetta, Georgia
F	10	Braxton Williams	6 ft 6 in (1.98 m)	215 lb (98 kg)	Sr	Valdosta State	Thomasville, Alabama
F	11	Dante Kearse	6 ft 4 in (1.93 m)	195 lb (88 kg)	So	Hargrave Military Academy	Richmond, Virginia
F	12	Aidan Alexander	6 ft 4 in (1.93 m)	180 lb (82 kg)	Fr	Bishop England High School	Charleston, South Carolina
G	13	Jack Walter	6 ft 2 in (1.88 m)	190 lb (86 kg)	Fr	IMG Academy	Honolulu, Hawaii
G	14	Carter Kingsbury	6 ft 5 in (1.96 m)	225 lb (102 kg)	Jr	Iowa	Ponca, Nebraska
F	15	Chase Williams	6 ft 8 in (2.03 m)	220 lb (100 kg)	Fr	West Bladen High School	Bladenboro, North Carolina
G	22	Keynan Davis	6 ft 5 in (1.96 m)	205 lb (93 kg)	Jr	Spire Academy	Chicago, Illinois
F	23	Simeon German	6 ft 10 in (2.08 m)	230 lb (104 kg)	Sr	USC Aiken	Lagos, Nigeria
G	24	Rowan Irelan	6 ft 3 in (1.91 m)	195 lb (88 kg)	So	Lucy Beckham High School	Mount Pleasant, South Carolina
F	25	Cassius Bonjasky	6 ft 7 in (2.01 m)	230 lb (104 kg)	Jr	New Mexico Military Institute	Almere, Netherlands
F	30	Logan Menefee	6 ft 10 in (2.08 m)	210 lb (95 kg)	Fr	Ridge Point High School	Missouri City, Texas

Head coach

- Ed Conroy (The Citadel)

Assistant coach(es)

- Cameron Wells (The Citadel)
- Del Harris (Virginia State)
- Andrew Glover (South Carolina)
- Brady Schuck (Furman)

Legend

- (C) Team captain
- (S) Suspended
- (I) Ineligible
- (W) Walk-on
- Injured
- Current redshirt

Roster
Last update: October 26, 2025

== Schedule and results ==
Date time, TV	Rank^{#}	Opponent^{#}	Result	Record	Site (attendance) city, state
Non-conference regular season
November 3, 2025*; 7:00 pm, ESPN+		Erskine	W 105–61	1–0	McAlister Field House (1,329); Charleston, SC
November 6, 2025*; 7:00 pm, ACCNX		at Boston College	L 47–76	1–1	Conte Forum (2,358); Chestnut Hill, MA
November 10, 2025*; 7:00 pm, ESPN+		Charleston Southern	L 86–96	1–2	McAlister Field House (1,719); Charleston, SC
November 14, 2025*; 7:00 pm, ESPN+		at West Georgia; SoCon-ASUN Challenge	L 92–100	1–3	The Coliseum (694); Carrollton, GA
November 19, 2025*; 7:00 pm, ESPN+		North Greenville	W 70–57	2–3	McAlister Field House (1,219); Charleston, SC
November 24, 2025*; 7:00 pm, ESPN+		Bellarmine	L 58–70	2–4	McAlister Field House (871); Charleston, SC
November 26, 2025*; 7:00 pm, ESPN+		Houston Christian	L 65–72	2–5	McAlister Field House (837); Charleston, SC
November 30, 2025*; 4:00 pm, ESPN+		vs. Presbyterian	L 41–69	2–6	Harrah's Cherokee Center (243); Asheville, NC
December 4, 2025*; 7:00 pm, ESPN+		at Davidson	L 63–79	2–7	John M. Belk Arena (1,990); Davidson, NC
December 9, 2025*; 7:00 pm, ESPN+		Southern Wesleyan	W 98–73	3–7	McAlister Field House (1,435); Charleston, SC
December 13, 2025*; 7:00 pm, ESPN+		at South Carolina	L 55–71	3–8	Colonial Life Arena (10,199); Columbia, SC
December 17, 2025*; 7:00 pm, FloHoops		at Charleston	L 78–82	3–9	TD Arena (4,763); Charleston, SC
December 20, 2025*; 6:00 pm, ESPN+		at Richmond	L 56–80	3–10	Robins Center (4,401); Richmond, VA
SoCon regular season
December 30, 2025; 6:00 pm, ESPN+		East Tennessee State	L 49–74	3–11 (0–1)	McAlister Field House (1,109); Charleston, SC
January 3, 2026; 1:00 pm, ESPN+		Wofford	L 86–95	3–12 (0–2)	McAlister Field House (1,323); Charleston, SC
January 7, 2026; 7:00 pm, ESPN+		at Mercer	L 63–101	3–13 (0–3)	Hawkins Arena (1,433); Macon, GA
January 10, 2026; 1:00 pm, ESPN+		Western Carolina	W 79–77 ^{OT}	4–13 (1–3)	McAlister Field House (1,201); Charleston, SC
January 15, 2026; 7:00 pm, ESPN+		at UNC Greensboro	L 66–69 ^{OT}	4–14 (1–4)	Bodford Arena (1,459); Greensboro, NC
January 17, 2026; 7:00 pm, ESPN+		at VMI	W 82–68	5–14 (2–4)	Cameron Hall (4,923); Lexington, VA
January 21, 2026; 7:00 pm, ESPN+		Furman	W 77–75 ^{OT}	6–14 (3–4)	McAlister Field House (1,433); Charleston, SC
January 23, 2026; 7:00 pm, ESPN+		at East Tennessee State	L 55–84	6–15 (3–5)	Freedom Hall Civic Center (3,765); Johnson City, TN
January 29, 2026; 7:00 pm, ESPN+		VMI	W 80–56	7–15 (4–5)	McAlister Field House (2,191); Charleston, SC
January 31, 2026; 12:00 pm, ESPN+		UNC Greensboro	W 71–66 ^{OT}	8–15 (5–5)	McAlister Field House (1,133); Charleston, SC
February 5, 2026; 8:00 pm, ESPN+		at Samford	L 64–78	8–16 (5–6)	Pete Hanna Center (1,145); Homewood, AL
February 7, 2026; 2:00 pm, ESPN+		at Chattanooga	W 78–71	9–16 (6–6)	McKenzie Arena (3,750); Chattanooga, TN
February 11, 2026; 6:00 pm, ESPN+		at Western Carolina	L 49–87	9–17 (6–7)	Ramsey Center (1,041); Cullowhee, NC
February 14, 2026; 1:00 pm, ESPN+		Mercer	L 54–70	9–18 (6–8)	McAlister Field House (1,171); Charleston, SC
February 19, 2026; 7:00 pm, ESPN+		Samford	L 75–78	9–19 (6–9)	McAlister Field House (1,721); Charleston, SC
February 21, 2026; 1:00 pm, ESPN+		Chattanooga	L 72–93	9–20 (6–10)	McAlister Field House (1,227); Charleston, SC
February 25, 2026; 6:00 pm, ESPN+		at Furman	L 51–72	9–21 (6–11)	Timmons Arena (2,500); Greenville, SC
February 28, 2026; 2:00 pm, ESPN+		at Wofford	W 93–90 ^{OT}	10–21 (7–11)	Jerry Richardson Indoor Stadium (1,356); Spartanburg, SC
SoCon tournament
March 6, 2026; 5:00 pm, ESPN+	(9)	vs. (8) Chattanooga; First round	W 88–85	11–21	Harrah's Cherokee Center; Asheville, NC
March 7, 2026; 12:00 pm, ESPN+	(9)	vs. (1) East Tennessee State; Quarterfinals	L 76–83	11–22	Harrah's Cherokee Center; Asheville, NC
*Non-conference game. ^{#}Rankings from AP Poll. (#) Tournament seedings in parentheses. All times are in Eastern.
