= 2025–26 VMI Keydets basketball team =

American college basketball season

2025–26 VMI Keydets basketball
- Conference: Southern Conference
- Record: 6–26 (1–17 SoCon)
- Head coach: Andrew Wilson (4th season)
- Associate head coach: Xavier Silas
- Assistant coaches: Paul Harrison; Austin Kenon; Nick Korta; Michael Caswell
- Home arena: Cameron Hall

2025–26 Southern Conference men's basketball standings
	Conf.				Overall
Team	W		L	PCT	W		L	PCT
East Tennessee State	13	–	5	.722	21	–	10	.677
Mercer	11	–	7	.611	19	–	12	.613
Wofford	11	–	7	.611	19	–	12	.613
Samford	11	–	7	.611	18	–	13	.581
Furman	10	–	8	.556	19	–	12	.613
Western Carolina	10	–	8	.556	14	–	15	.483
UNC Greensboro	9	–	9	.500	14	–	18	.438
Chattanooga	7	–	11	.389	13	–	19	.406
The Citadel	7	–	11	.389	11	–	21	.344
VMI	1	–	17	.056	6	–	26	.188
† 2026 SoCon tournament winner As of March 6, 2026

The 2025–26 VMI Keydets basketball team represented the Virginia Military Institute during the 2025–26 NCAA Division I men's basketball season. The Keydets, who were led by fourth-year head coach Andrew Wilson, played their home games at Cameron Hall in Lexington, Virginia as members of the Southern Conference (SoCon).

== Previous season ==
The Keydets finished the 2024–25 season 15–19, 7–11 in SoCon play, to finish in seventh place. They defeated The Citadel and upset #2 seed UNC Greensboro, before falling to eventual tournament champions Wofford in the semifinals of the SoCon tournament.

== Preseason ==
On October 1, 2025, the SoCon released their preseason coaches poll. VMI was picked to finish sixth in the conference.

=== Preseason rankings ===
SoCon Preseason Poll
Place	Team	Points
1	Chattanooga	77 (5)
2	Furman	73 (5)
3	Samford	62
4	East Tennessee State	61
5	UNC Greensboro	43
6	VMI	41
7	Western Carolina	32
8	Mercer	30
9	Wofford	21
10	The Citadel	10
(#) first-place votes

=== Preseason SoCon Player of the Year ===
Preseason SoCon Player of the Year
Player	Year	Position
Rickey Bradley Jr.	Senior	Guard

=== Preseason All-SoCon Team ===
Preseason All-SoCon Team
Player	Year	Position
Rickey Bradley Jr.	Senior	Guard

== Roster ==
2025–26 VMI Keydets men's basketball team
Players
Coaches

Pos.	#	Name	Height	Weight	Year	Previous school	Hometown
F	0	Cal Liston	6 ft 5 in (1.96 m)	217 lb (98 kg)	So	Lassiter High School	Marietta, Georgia
G	1	Rickey Bradley Jr.	6 ft 2 in (1.88 m)	200 lb (91 kg)	Sr	Georgia State	Milwaukee, Wisconsin
G	2	Mario Tatum Jr.	6 ft 3 in (1.91 m)	190 lb (86 kg)	Fr	Our Lady of Mount Carmel School	Edgewood, Maryland
F	3	Mason Hagedorn	6 ft 9 in (2.06 m)	225 lb (102 kg)	So	Wake Forest	Rochester, New York
G	4	Linus Holmström	6 ft 3 in (1.91 m)	195 lb (88 kg)	So	Colorado Prep	Stockholm, Sweden
G	5	AJ Clark	6 ft 4 in (1.93 m)	184 lb (83 kg)	Jr	Menchville High School	Suffolk, Virginia
F	6	Kaden Stuckey	6 ft 8 in (2.03 m)	232 lb (105 kg)	So	Orangeville Prep	Buffalo, New York
G	7	Jaylen Pazon	6 ft 5 in (1.96 m)	195 lb (88 kg)	So	Shaun Dumas Academy	New Orleans, Louisiana
F	9	Alexander Daushvili	6 ft 8 in (2.03 m)	211 lb (96 kg)	Fr	The Guivy Zaldastanishvili American Academy	Tbilisi, Georgia
G	14	Walker Andrews	6 ft 1 in (1.85 m)	180 lb (82 kg)	RS So	Northfield Mount Hermon School	Fincastle, Virginia
G	21	Branford Edmonds III	6 ft 2 in (1.88 m)	185 lb (84 kg)	So	La Plata High School	La Plata, Maryland
G	30	Tan Yildizoglu	6 ft 4 in (1.93 m)	190 lb (86 kg)	Jr	Pacific	Istanbul, Turkey
F	32	Robert Peters	6 ft 8 in (2.03 m)	220 lb (100 kg)	Jr	Nathan Hale High School	West Allis, Wisconsin
G	42	Mason Lawson	6 ft 1 in (1.85 m)	185 lb (84 kg)	So	Boston Latin Academy	Boston, Massachusetts
F	44	TJ Johnson	6 ft 7 in (2.01 m)	215 lb (98 kg)	Jr	Lipscomb	Belton, Texas

Head coach

- Andrew Wilson (Florida State)

Assistant coach(es)

- Xavier Silas (Northern Illinois)
- Paul Harrison (Washington and Lee)
- Austin Kenon (VMI)
- Nick Korta (Cleveland State)
- Michael Caswell (Florida State)

Legend

- (C) Team captain
- (S) Suspended
- (I) Ineligible
- (W) Walk-on
- Injured
- Current redshirt

Roster
Last update: October 26, 2025

== Schedule and results ==
Date time, TV	Rank^{#}	Opponent^{#}	Result	Record	Site (attendance) city, state
Non-conference regular season
November 3, 2025*; 6:00 pm, ESPN+		Johnson & Wales Charlotte	W 122–58	1–0	Cameron Hall (1,017); Lexington, VA
November 7, 2025*; 8:30 pm, ESPN+		at Southern Indiana	W 78–74	2–0	Liberty Arena (1,669); Evansville, IN
November 9, 2025*; 2:00 pm, SECN		at Missouri	L 68–106	2–1	Mizzou Arena (7,986); Columbia, MO
November 12, 2025*; 6:00 pm, ESPN+		Virginia Lynchburg	W 106–54	3–1	Cameron Hall (1,035); Lexington, VA
November 15, 2025*; 1:00 pm, ESPN+		Jacksonville; SoCon/ASUN Challenge	L 67–69	3–2	Cameron Hall (2,256); Lexington, VA
November 19, 2025*; 7:00 pm, ESPN+		at Richmond	L 54–87	3–3	Robins Center (4,393); Richmond, VA
November 22, 2025*; 7:00 pm, ESPN+		at Stetson; SoCon/ASUN Challenge	L 80–99	3–4	Edmunds Center (742); DeLand, FL
November 24, 2025*; 2:30 pm, PTB Live		vs. Buffalo; Fort Myers Tip-Off Palms Division	L 70–78	3–5	Suncoast Credit Union Arena (682); Fort Myers, FL
November 26, 2025*; 11:00 am, PTB Live		vs. Bowling Green; Fort Myers Tip-Off Palms Division	L 48–81	3–6	Suncoast Credit Union Arena (680); Fort Myers, FL
November 29, 2025*; 1:00 pm, ESPN+		at UCF	L 57–82	3–7	Addition Financial Arena (4,905); Orlando, FL
December 5, 2025*; 7:30 pm, ESPN+		Christendom	W 89–36	4–7	Cameron Hall (2,365); Lexington, VA
December 9, 2025*; 6:00 pm, ESPN+		Loyola (MD)	W 86–70	5–7	Cameron Hall (2,831); Lexington, VA
December 21, 2025*; 2:30 pm, ESPN+		at Radford	L 90–97	5–8	Dedmon Center (954); Radford, VA
SoCon regular season
January 1, 2026; 1:00 pm, ESPN+		Samford	L 58–78	5–9 (0–1)	Cameron Hall (652); Lexington, VA
January 3, 2026; 1:00 pm, ESPN+		Chattanooga	W 79–71	6–9 (1–1)	Cameron Hall (965); Lexington, VA
January 7, 2026; 7:00 pm, ESPN+		at East Tennessee State	L 67–81	6–10 (1–2)	Freedom Hall (3,074); Johnson City, TN
January 10, 2026; 2:00 pm, ESPN+		at Furman	L 48–69	6–11 (1–3)	Timmons Arena (2,447); Greenville, SC
January 15, 2026; 6:00 pm, ESPN+		Mercer	L 67–77	6–12 (1–4)	Cameron Hall (1,276); Lexington, VA
January 17, 2026; 7:00 pm, ESPN+		The Citadel	L 68–82	6–13 (1–5)	Cameron Hall (4,923); Lexington, VA
January 21, 2026; 6:00 pm, ESPN+		UNC Greensboro	L 78–85	6–14 (1–6)	Cameron Hall (1,275); Lexington, VA
January 24, 2026; 3:30 pm, ESPN+		at Western Carolina	L 58–88	6–15 (1–7)	Ramsey Center (1,418); Cullowhee, NC
January 29, 2026; 7:00 pm, ESPN+		at The Citadel	L 56–80	6–16 (1–8)	McAlister Field House (2,191); Charleston, SC
January 31, 2026; 2:00 pm, ESPN+		at Mercer	L 81–95	6–17 (1–9)	Hawkins Arena (1,520); Macon, GA
February 4, 2026; 6:00 pm, ESPN+		Wofford	L 67–81	6–18 (1–10)	Cameron Hall (1,264); Lexington, VA
February 7, 2026; 1:00 pm, ESPN+		East Tennessee State	L 70–87	6–19 (1–11)	Cameron Hall (1,433); Lexington, VA
February 11, 2026; 7:00 pm, ESPN+		at UNC Greensboro	L 71–92	6−20 (1−12)	Bodford Arena (1,115); Greensboro, NC
February 14, 2026; 1:00 pm, ESPN+		Furman	L 72–90	6–21 (1–13)	Cameron Hall (2,233); Lexington, VA
February 18, 2026; 6:00 pm, ESPN+		at Wofford	L 76–82	6–22 (1–14)	Jerry Richardson Indoor Stadium (1,091); Spartanburg, SC
February 21, 2026; 1:00 pm, ESPN+		Western Carolina	L 62–81	6–23 (1–15)	Cameron Hall (2,284); Lexington, VA
February 26, 2026; 7:00 pm, ESPN+		at Samford	L 61–80	6–24 (1–16)	Pete Hanna Center (1,213); Homewood, AL
February 28, 2026; 2:00 pm, ESPN+		at Chattanooga	L 79–86	6–25 (1–17)	McKenzie Arena (3,824); Chattanooga, TN
SoCon tournament
March 5, 2026; 7:30 pm, ESPN+	(10)	vs. (7) UNC Greensboro; First round	L 70–84	6–26	Harrah's Cherokee Center; Asheville, NC
*Non-conference game. ^{#}Rankings from AP Poll. (#) Tournament seedings in parentheses. All times are in Eastern.
