= 2025–26 UNC Greensboro Spartans men's basketball team =

American college basketball season

2025–26 UNC Greensboro Spartans men's basketball
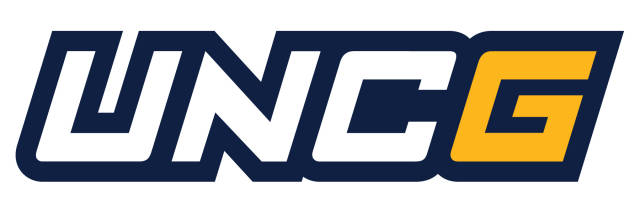
- Conference: Southern Conference
- Record: 15–19 (9–9 SoCon)
- Head coach: Mike Jones (5th season)
- Assistant coaches: Bryant Stith; Brett Gilbert; Josh Gross; C.J. Lee; Randy Phillips
- Home arena: First Horizon Coliseum; Bodford Arena

2025–26 Southern Conference men's basketball standings
	Conf.				Overall
Team	W		L	PCT	W		L	PCT
East Tennessee State	13	–	5	.722	23	–	10	.697
Wofford	11	–	7	.611	19	–	13	.594
Samford	11	–	7	.611	18	–	14	.563
Mercer	11	–	7	.611	19	–	13	.594
Western Carolina	10	–	8	.556	15	–	16	.484
Furman	10	–	8	.556	21	–	12	.636
UNC Greensboro	9	–	9	.500	15	–	19	.441
Chattanooga	7	–	11	.389	13	–	19	.406
The Citadel	7	–	11	.389	11	–	22	.333
VMI	1	–	17	.056	6	–	26	.188
† 2026 SoCon tournament winner As of March 8, 2026

The 2025–26 UNC Greensboro Spartans men's basketball team represented the University of North Carolina at Greensboro during the 2025–26 NCAA Division I men's basketball season. The Spartans, led by fifth-year head coach Mike Jones, played their home games at the First Horizon Coliseum and Bodford Arena in Greensboro, North Carolina as members of the Southern Conference (SoCon).

== Previous season ==
The Spartans finished the 2024–25 season 20–12, 13–5 in SoCon play, to finish in second place. They were upset by #7 seed VMI in the quarterfinals of the SoCon tournament.

== Preseason ==
On October 1, 2025, the SoCon released their preseason coaches poll. UNC Greensboro was picked to finish fifth in the conference.

=== Preseason rankings ===
SoCon Preseason Poll
Place	Team	Points
1	Chattanooga	77 (5)
2	Furman	73 (5)
3	Samford	62
4	East Tennessee State	61
5	UNC Greensboro	43
6	VMI	41
7	Western Carolina	32
8	Mercer	30
9	Wofford	21
10	The Citadel	10
(#) first-place votes

=== Preseason All-SoCon Team ===
No players were named the Preseason All-SoCon Team.

== Roster ==
2025–26 UNC Greensboro Spartans men's basketball team
Players
Coaches

Pos.	#	Name	Height	Weight	Year	Previous school	Hometown
G/F	0	Antwann Jones	6 ft 6 in (1.98 m)	225 lb (102 kg)	GS	UCF	Orlando, Florida
F	2	Clinton Efinda	6 ft 5 in (1.96 m)	220 lb (100 kg)	Jr	Ellsworth Community College	Naas, Ireland
G	3	Jordan Brown	6 ft 1 in (1.85 m)	200 lb (91 kg)	Sr	Gaston College	Atlanta, Georgia
G	4	Assane Mandian	6 ft 7 in (2.01 m)	205 lb (93 kg)	Fr	NBA Academy Africa	Saly, Senegal
G	6	Noah Norgaard	6 ft 2 in (1.88 m)	194 lb (88 kg)	Fr	La Laguna Tenerife	Copenhagen, Denmark
G	7	Clyde Bailey II (W)	6 ft 1 in (1.85 m)	180 lb (82 kg)	Sr	Cape Henry Collegiate	Virginia Beach, Virginia
F	8	Chane Bynum	6 ft 9 in (2.06 m)	195 lb (88 kg)	Fr	KIPP Atlanta	Atlanta, Georgia
G	9	Braylen Bowman	6 ft 1 in (1.85 m)	170 lb (77 kg)	Fr	Carmel Christian School	Charlotte, North Carolina
F	11	Valentino Pinedo	6 ft 8 in (2.03 m)	230 lb (104 kg)	Sr	Saint Francis (PA)	Murcia, Spain
F	12	Justin Neely	6 ft 6 in (1.98 m)	220 lb (100 kg)	GS	Albany	Miami Beach, Florida
G	13	Donald Whitehead Jr.	5 ft 10 in (1.78 m)	160 lb (73 kg)	GS	California (PA)	Hermitage, Pennsylvania
F	16	Domas Kauzonas	6 ft 10 in (2.08 m)	240 lb (109 kg)	Jr	Rabun Gap-Nacoochee School	Vilnius, Lithuania
G	21	KJ Younger	6 ft 4 in (1.93 m)	218 lb (99 kg)	Fr	Weddington High School	Matthews, North Carolina
G	24	Landon King	6 ft 1 in (1.85 m)	188 lb (85 kg)	Jr	Brunswick Community College	Charlotte, North Carolina
G	45	Lilian Marville	6 ft 1 in (1.85 m)	180 lb (82 kg)	Fr	Orléans Loiret Basket	Orléans, France

Head coach

- Mike Jones (Howard)

Assistant coach(es)

- Bryant Stith (Virginia)
- Brett Gilbert (Lebanon Valley)
- Josh Gross (UNC Greensboro)
- C.J. Lee (UNC Greensboro)
- Randy Phillips (Radford)

Legend

- (C) Team captain
- (S) Suspended
- (I) Ineligible
- (W) Walk-on
- Injured
- Current redshirt

Roster
Last update: October 26, 2025

== Schedule and results ==
Date time, TV	Rank^{#}	Opponent^{#}	Result	Record	High points	High rebounds	High assists	Site (attendance) city, state
Non-conference regular season
November 4, 2025*; 8:00 pm, ESPN+		at Kansas State	L 64–93	0–1	15 – Neely	9 – Neely	5 – Neely	Bramlage Coliseum (7,765); Manhattan, KS
November 8, 2025*; 4:00 pm, ESPN+		Elon	L 90–92 ^{OT}	0–2	18 – Whitehead Jr.	11 – Neely	9 – Neely	Bodford Arena (1,718); Greensboro, NC
November 12, 2025*; 8:00 pm, ACCN		at NC State	L 64–110	0–3	21 – Whitehead Jr.	13 – Neely	3 – Marville	Lenovo Center (14,516); Raleigh, NC
November 15, 2025*; 2:00 pm, ESPN+		Austin Peay; SoCon/ASUN Challenge	L 63–69	0–4	15 – Neely	14 – Neely	4 – Norgaard	Bodford Arena (906); Greensboro, NC
November 20, 2025*; 7:00 pm, ESPN+		at Queens; SoCon/ASUN Challenge	L 94–101	0–5	22 – Younger	8 – Neely	2 – Tied	Curry Arena (637); Charlotte, NC
November 23, 2025*; 5:30 pm, PTB Live		vs. Youngstown State; Jacksonville Classic	W 68–62	1–5	16 – Neely	16 – Neely	3 – Neely	John Hurst Adams Gymnasium (346); Jacksonville, FL
November 25, 2025*; 1:30 pm, PTB Live		vs. Delaware; Jacksonville Classic	L 60–73	1–6	17 – Marville	10 – Neely	3 – Neely	John Hurst Adams Gymnasium (146); Jacksonville, FL
November 26, 2025*; 2:00 pm, SIACN		vs. Miami (OH); Riley Decker Showcase	L 71–82	1–7	14 – Younger	11 – Neely	1 – Tied	John Hurst Adams Gymnasium (46); Jacksonville, FL
December 2, 2025*; 7:00 pm, ESPN+		vs. UNC Asheville	L 77–82	1–8	13 – Whitehead Jr.	10 – Neely	5 – Whitehead Jr.	Harrah's Cherokee Center (444); Asheville, NC
December 6, 2025*; 4:00 pm, ESPN+		at East Carolina	W 82–78	2–8	23 – Neely	8 – Neely	4 – Whitehead Jr.	Williams Arena (2,973); Greenville, NC
December 12, 2025*; 7:00 pm, ESPN+		William Peace	W 90–62	3–8	24 – Neely	11 – Neely	4 – Tied	Bodford Arena (349); Greensboro, NC
December 16, 2025*; 7:00 pm, ESPN+		North Carolina A&T; Battle of Market Street	L 65–71	3–9	17 – Younger	11 – Neely	4 – Whitehead Jr.	First Horizon Coliseum (1,237); Greensboro, NC
December 21, 2025*; 2:00 pm, ESPN+		Virginia Lynchburg	W 131–53	4–9	20 – Tied	14 – Neely	7 – Whitehead Jr.	Bodford Arena (252); Greensboro, NC
SoCon regular season
January 1, 2026; 4:00 pm, ESPN+		Chattanooga	W 77–72	5–9 (1–0)	24 – Younger	11 – Neely	4 – Neely	Bodford Arena (435); Greensboro, NC
January 3, 2026; 4:00 pm, ESPN+		Samford	W 89–82	6–9 (2–0)	22 – Neely	14 – Neely	3 – Tied	Bodford Arena (439); Greensboro, NC
January 7, 2026; 6:00 pm, Nexstar/ESPN+		at Wofford	L 85–97	6–10 (2–1)	26 – Neely	10 – Pinedo	2 – Tied	Jerry Richardson Indoor Stadium (1,375); Spartanburg, SC
January 10, 2026; 4:00 pm, ESPN+		at East Tennessee State	L 60–86	6–11 (2–2)	13 – Younger	13 – Neely	2 – Neely	Freedom Hall Civic Center (3,984); Johnson City, TN
January 15, 2026; 7:00 pm, ESPN+		The Citadel	W 69–66 ^{OT}	7–11 (3–2)	23 – Neely	16 – Neely	3 – Tied	Bodford Arena (1,459); Greensboro, NC
January 17, 2026; 4:00 pm, ESPN+		Mercer	L 92–102	7–12 (3–3)	21 – Younger	7 – Tied	4 – Marville	First Horizon Coliseum (1,368); Greensboro, NC
January 21, 2026; 6:00 pm, ESPN+		at VMI	W 85–78	8–12 (4–3)	22 – Neely	22 – Neely	3 – Tied	Cameron Hall (1,275); Lexington, VA
January 23, 2026; 3:00 pm, ESPN+		Furman	L 66–89	8–13 (4–4)	20 – Neeley	9 – Neeley	3 – Tied	Bodford Arena (814); Greensboro, NC
January 29, 2026; 7:00 pm, ESPN+		at Mercer	L 77–95	8–14 (4–5)	30 – Younger	11 – Neely	4 – Tied	Hawkins Arena (973); Macon, GA
January 31, 2026; 12:00 pm, ESPN+		at The Citadel	L 66–71 ^{OT}	8–15 (4–6)	24 – Younger	13 – Neely	3 – Tied	McAlister Field House (1,133); Charleston, SC
February 4, 2026; 6:00 pm, ESPN+		Western Carolina	W 81–78	9–15 (5–6)	25 – Neely	11 – Neely	4 – Tied	Bodford Arena (1,204); Greensboro, NC
February 8, 2026; 1:00 pm, ESPN2		at Furman	W 67-64	10-15 (6-6)	24 – Neely	13 – Neely	4 – Norgaard	Timmons Arena (2,497); Greenville, SC
February 11, 2026; 7:00 pm, ESPN+		VMI	W 92−71	11−15 (7−6)	21 – Tied	9 – Neely	7 – Norgaard	Bodford Arena (1,115); Greensboro, NC
February 14, 2026; 5:00 pm, ESPN+		Wofford	W 99–89	12–15 (8–6)	29 – Neely	16 – Neely	7 – Marville	Bodford Arena (1,242); Greensboro, NC
February 18, 2026; 7:00 pm, ESPN+		at Western Carolina	L 77–91	12–16 (8–7)	35 – Neely	8 – Neely	4 – Neely	Ramsey Center (1,692); Cullowhee, NC
February 21, 2026; 4:00 pm, ESPN+		East Tennessee State	L 75–87	12–17 (8–8)	20 – Younger	9 – Pinedo	5 – Pinedo	Bodford Arena (1,498); Greensboro, NC
February 26, 2026; 7:00 pm, ESPN+		at Chattanooga	W 85–80	13–17 (9–8)	18 – Neely	17 – Neely	5 – Marville	McKenzie Arena (4,164); Chattanooga, TN
February 28, 2026; 6:00 pm, ESPN+		at Samford	L 78–87	13–18 (9–9)	21 – Marville	8 – Pinedo	3 – Tied	Pete Hanna Center (1,875); Homewood, AL
SoCon tournament
March 6, 2026; 7:30 pm, ESPN+	(7)	vs. (10) VMI; First round	W 84–70	14–18	29 – Younger	10 – Neely	5 – Tied	Harrah's Cherokee Center; Asheville, NC
March 7, 2026; 2:30 pm, ESPN+	(7)	vs. (2) Wofford; Quarterfinals	W 75–72	15–18	22 – Neely	24 – Neely	9 – Marville	Harrah's Cherokee Center (5,140); Asheville, NC
March 8, 2026; 6:30 pm, ESPNU	(7)	vs. (6) Furman; Semifinals	L 75–81	15–19	27 – Neely	5 – Tied	3 – Norgaard	Harrah's Cherokee Center (5,285); Asheville, NC
*Non-conference game. ^{#}Rankings from AP Poll. (#) Tournament seedings in parentheses. All times are in Eastern.
