= 2026 Southern Conference men's basketball tournament =

American college basketball postseason tournament

- Classification: Division I
- Season: 2025–26
- Teams: 10
- Site: Harrah's Cherokee Center; Asheville, North Carolina
- Champions: Furman (8th title)
- Winning coach: Bob Richey (2nd title)
- MVP: Alex Wilkins (Furman)
- Television: ESPN+

2025–26 Southern Conference men's basketball standings
	Conf.				Overall
Team	W		L	PCT	W		L	PCT
East Tennessee State	13	–	5	.722	23	–	11	.676
Wofford	11	–	7	.611	19	–	13	.594
Samford	11	–	7	.611	18	–	14	.563
Mercer	11	–	7	.611	19	–	13	.594
Western Carolina	10	–	8	.556	15	–	16	.484
Furman †	10	–	8	.556	22	–	13	.629
UNC Greensboro	9	–	9	.500	15	–	19	.441
Chattanooga	7	–	11	.389	13	–	19	.406
The Citadel	7	–	11	.389	11	–	22	.333
VMI	1	–	17	.056	6	–	26	.188
† 2026 SoCon tournament winner

The 2026 Southern Conference Men's Basketball Tournament was the postseason men's basketball tournament for the Southern Conference for the 2025–26 season. All tournament games were played at the Harrah's Cherokee Center in Asheville, North Carolina, from March 6–9, 2026. The winner of the tournament, Furman, received the conference's automatic bid to the 2026 NCAA Division I Men's Basketball Tournament.

== Seeds ==
All ten teams in the Southern Conference were eligible to compete in the conference tournament. Teams were seeded by record within the conference, with a tiebreaker system to seed teams with identical conference records. The top six teams received first-round byes.

Seed	School	Conference	Tiebreaker 1	Tiebreaker 2
1	East Tennessee State	13–5		
2	Wofford	11–7	2–0 vs. Western Carolina	1–1 vs. Furman
3	Samford	11–7	2–0 vs. Western Carolina	0–2 vs. Furman
4	Mercer	11–7	1–1 vs. Western Carolina	
5	Western Carolina	10–8	2–0 vs. Furman	
6	Furman	10–8	0–2 vs. Western Carolina	
7	UNC Greensboro	9–9		
8	Chattanooga	7–11	1–1 vs. Samford	
9	The Citadel	7–11	0–2 vs. Samford	
10	VMI	1–17		

== Schedule and results ==
Game	Time	Matchup	Score	Television
First round – Friday, March 6
1	5:00 p.m.	No. 8 Chattanooga vs. No. 9 The Citadel	85−88	ESPN+
2	7:30 p.m.	No. 7 UNC Greensboro vs. No. 10 VMI	84−70	ESPN+
Quarterfinals – Saturday, March 7
3	12:00 p.m.	No. 1 East Tennessee State vs. No. 9 The Citadel	83−76	ESPN+
4	2:30 p.m.	No. 2 Wofford vs. No. 7 UNC Greensboro	72−75	ESPN+
5	6:00 p.m.	No. 3 Samford vs. No. 6 Furman	81−86	ESPN+
6	8:30 p.m.	No. 4 Mercer vs. No. 5 Western Carolina	73−77	ESPN+
Semifinals – Sunday, March 8
7	4:00 p.m.	No. 1 East Tennessee State vs. No. 5 Western Carolina	69−67	ESPNU
8	6:30 p.m.	No. 7 UNC Greensboro vs No. 6 Furman	75−81	ESPNU
Final – Monday, March 9
9	7:00 p.m.	No. 1 East Tennessee State vs. No. 6 Furman	61−76	ESPN
Game times in Eastern Time. Rankings denote tournament seed.

== Bracket ==
First round March 6 ESPN+
8	Chattanooga	85
9	The Citadel	88
7	UNC Greensboro	84
10	VMI	70

Quarterfinals; March 7 ESPN+
1	East Tennessee State	83
9	The Citadel	76
4	Mercer	73
5	Western Carolina	77
2	Wofford	72
7	UNC Greensboro	75
3	Samford	81
6	Furman	86

Semifinals; March 8 ESPNU
1	East Tennessee State	69
5	Western Carolina	67
7	UNC Greensboro	75
6	Furman	81

Championship; March 9 ESPN
1	East Tennessee State	61
6	Furman	76

Game times are in Eastern Time.
Rankings denote tournament seed.
"OT" superscript denotes games that went into overtime.
Source: Southern Conference

== Awards and honors ==
**2026 SoCon Men's Basketball All-Tournament Teams**
First Team	Second Team
Blake Barkley – East Tennessee State; Brian Taylor II – East Tennessee State; Cooper Bowser – Furman; **Alex Wilkins** – Furman; Justin Neely – UNC Greensboro	Sola Adebisi – The Citadel; Jaylen Smith – East Tennessee State; Tom House – Furman; KJ Younger – UNC Greensboro; Jadin Booth – Samford

MVP in bold

== See also ==
- 2026 Southern Conference women's basketball tournament
