= Kevin Giltner =

American basketball coach

Current position
- Title: Head coach
- Team: Wofford
- Conference: Southern Conference
- Record: 19–13 (.594)

Biographical details
- Born: October 9, 1989 (age 36)

Playing career
- 2008–2012: Wofford
- 2012–2013: Keflavík

Coaching career (HC unless noted)
- 2014–2019: Wofford (assistant)
- 2020–2025: Virginia Tech (assistant)
- 2025–present: Wofford

Administrative career (AD unless noted)
- 2013–2014: Wofford (DBO)
- 2019–2020: Virginia Tech (assistant to HC)

Head coaching record
- Overall: 19–13 (.594)

Kevin Zachary Giltner is an American college basketball coach who is the head coach of the Wofford Terriers men's basketball team.

== Early life and playing career ==
Giltner grew up in Kingston Springs, Tennessee and attended Harpeth High School, where he played basketball and football. He played college basketball for the Wofford Terriers. He became a starter as a senior and was named first team All-Southern Conference after averaging 14.8 points per game. After graduating, Giltner played one season professionally for Keflavík of the Icelandic Úrvalsdeild karla.

== Coaching career ==
Giltner began his coaching career as the director of basketball operations at Wofford in 2013. He was promoted to assistant coach after one season. Giltner was hired as the special assistant to the head coach at Virginia Tech in 2019 after former Wofford head coach Mike Young was hired to lead the Hokies. He was elevated to an assistant coaching position before the start of the 2020–2021 season.

Giltner was hired as the head coach at Wofford on September 19, 2025.

== Head coaching record ==
Statistics overview
Season	Team	Overall	Conference	Standing	Postseason
Wofford Terriers (Southern Conference) (2025–present)
2025–26	Wofford	19–13	11–7	T–2nd	
Wofford:		19–13 (.594)	11–7 (.611)		
Total:		19–13 (.594)			
National champion Postseason invitational champion Conference regular season champion Conference regular season and conference tournament champion Division regular season champion Division regular season and conference tournament champion Conference tournament champion
