= 2025–26 Mercer Bears men's basketball team =

American college basketball season

2025–26 Mercer Bears men's basketball
- Conference: Southern Conference
- Record: 19–13 (11–7 SoCon)
- Head coach: Ryan Ridder (2nd season)
- Assistant coaches: Reed Ridder; Jonathan Mitchell; Daniel Mondragon; Langston Hall
- Home arena: Hawkins Arena

2025–26 Southern Conference men's basketball standings
| | Conf. | | | | Overall |
| Team | W | | L | PCT | W | | L | PCT |
|---|---|---|---|---|---|---|---|---|
| East Tennessee State | 13 | – | 5 | .722 | 23 | – | 11 | .676 |
| Wofford | 11 | – | 7 | .611 | 19 | – | 13 | .594 |
| Samford | 11 | – | 7 | .611 | 18 | – | 14 | .563 |
| Mercer | 11 | – | 7 | .611 | 19 | – | 13 | .594 |
| Western Carolina | 10 | – | 8 | .556 | 15 | – | 16 | .484 |
| Furman † | 10 | – | 8 | .556 | 22 | – | 12 | .647 |
| UNC Greensboro | 9 | – | 9 | .500 | 15 | – | 19 | .441 |
| Chattanooga | 7 | – | 11 | .389 | 13 | – | 19 | .406 |
| The Citadel | 7 | – | 11 | .389 | 11 | – | 22 | .333 |
| VMI | 1 | – | 17 | .056 | 6 | – | 26 | .188 |
† 2026 SoCon tournament winner As of March 9, 2026

The 2025–26 Mercer Bears men's basketball team represented Mercer University during the 2025–26 NCAA Division I men's basketball season. The Bears, led by second-year head coach Ryan Ridder, played their home games at Hawkins Arena in Macon, Georgia as members of the Southern Conference (SoCon).

== Previous season ==
The Bears finished the 2024–25 season 14–19, 6–12 in SoCon play, to finish in eighth place. They defeated Western Carolina, before falling to top-seeded Chattanooga in the quarterfinals of the SoCon tournament.

== Preseason ==
On October 1, 2025, the SoCon released their preseason coaches poll. Mercer was picked to finish eighth in the conference.

=== Preseason rankings ===
SoCon Preseason Poll
| Place | Team | Points |
|---|---|---|
| 1 | Chattanooga | 77 (5) |
| 2 | Furman | 73 (5) |
| 3 | Samford | 62 |
| 4 | East Tennessee State | 61 |
| 5 | UNC Greensboro | 43 |
| 6 | VMI | 41 |
| 7 | Western Carolina | 32 |
| 8 | Mercer | 30 |
| 9 | Wofford | 21 |
| 10 | The Citadel | 10 |
(#) first-place votes

=== Preseason All-SoCon Team ===
No players were named the Preseason All-SoCon Team.

== Roster ==
2025–26 Mercer Bears men's basketball team
Players
Coaches

| Pos. | # | Name | Height | Weight | Year | Previous school | Hometown |
|---|---|---|---|---|---|---|---|
| G/F | 0 | NJ Nganga | 6 ft 7 in (2.01 m) | — | Fr | BTS Prep | Dallas, Texas |
| G | 1 | Zaire Williams | 6 ft 4 in (1.93 m) | 200 lb (91 kg) | GS | Wagner | Brooklyn, New York |
| F | 2 | Connor Serven | 6 ft 8 in (2.03 m) | 225 lb (102 kg) | GS | Virginia Tech | Prairie City, Illinois |
| G | 3 | Quinton Perkins II | 6 ft 1 in (1.85 m) | 180 lb (82 kg) | RS So | Indian Hills Community College | Dallas, Texas |
| G | 5 | Kyle Cuffe Jr. | 6 ft 2 in (1.88 m) | 190 lb (86 kg) | RS Sr | Syracuse | Harlem, New York |
| G | 6 | Baraka Okojie | 6 ft 3 in (1.91 m) | 195 lb (88 kg) | Jr | Memphis | Brampton, Ontario |
| F | 8 | Bendji Pierre | 6 ft 8 in (2.03 m) | 230 lb (104 kg) | Sr | San Diego | Irvington, New Jersey |
| G | 10 | Tristan Gross | 6 ft 6 in (1.98 m) | 185 lb (84 kg) | Jr | Stetson | St. Petersburg, Florida |
| G | 10 | Brady Shoulders | 6 ft 6 in (1.98 m) | 200 lb (91 kg) | So | Lyon County High School | Eddyville, Kentucky |
| F | 12 | Petras Padegimas | 6 ft 8 in (2.03 m) | 220 lb (100 kg) | RS So | Dayton | Kaunas, Lithuania |
| G/F | 14 | TJ Grant | 6 ft 5 in (1.96 m) | 210 lb (95 kg) | Sr | Veterans High School | Warner Robins, Georgia |
| F | 15 | Alex Koch | 6 ft 8 in (2.03 m) | 200 lb (91 kg) | So | Cedar Shoals High School | Athens, Georgia |
| G | 22 | Jaydon Cole | 6 ft 3 in (1.91 m) | 180 lb (82 kg) | Fr | Milton High School | Milton, Georgia |
| G | 23 | Braeden Carlsen | 6 ft 4 in (1.93 m) | 200 lb (91 kg) | RS Fr | Wauconda High School | Wauconda, Illinois |
| C | 26 | Armani Mighty | 6 ft 10 in (2.08 m) | 240 lb (109 kg) | RS Jr | Central Michigan | Toronto, Ontario |
| F | 30 | Pero Zubac | 6 ft 10 in (2.08 m) | 235 lb (107 kg) | Fr | HKK Zrinjski Mostar | Čitluk, Bosnia and Herzegovina |

Head coach

- Ryan Ridder (Embry–Riddle)

Assistant coach(es)

- Reed Ridder (Embry–Riddle)
- Jonathan Mitchell (Rutgers)
- Daniel Mondragon (Embry–Riddle)
- Langston Hall (Mercer)

Legend

- (C) Team captain
- (S) Suspended
- (I) Ineligible
- (W) Walk-on
- Injured
- Current redshirt

Roster
Last update: October 24, 2025

== Schedule and results ==
| Date time, TV | Rank^{#} | Opponent^{#} | Result | Record | Site (attendance) city, state |
Non-conference regular season
| November 3, 2025*; 7:00 pm, SECN+ | | at No. 18 Tennessee | L 61–76 | 0–1 | Thompson–Boling Arena (18,559); Knoxville, TN |
| November 5, 2025*; 7:00 pm, ESPN+ | | LaGrange | W 101–62 | 1–1 | Hawkins Arena (825); Macon, GA |
| November 9, 2025*; 2:00 pm, ESPN+ | | Lipscomb; SoCon/ASUN Challenge | W 92–77 | 2–1 | Hawkins Arena (604); Macon, GA |
| November 15, 2025*; 2:00 pm, ESPN+ | | at Winthrop | L 69–105 | 2–2 | Winthrop Coliseum (2,637); Rock Hill, SC |
| November 22, 2025*; 3:00 pm, ESPN+ | | at Eastern Kentucky; SoCon/ASUN Challenge | W 95–83 | 3–2 | Baptist Health Arena (1,700); Richmond, KY |
| November 26, 2025*; 2:00 pm, ESPN+ | | Appalachian State | W 75–67 | 4–2 | Hawkins Arena (709); Macon, GA |
| November 29, 2025*; 4:00 pm, FloCollege | | at Elon | W 91–84 | 5–2 | Schar Center (1,026); Elon, NC |
| December 2, 2025*; 7:00 pm, ESPN+ | | Georgia State | W 78–67 | 6–2 | Hawkins Arena (955); Macon, GA |
| December 7, 2025*; 2:00 pm, ESPN+ | | Oglethorpe | W 100–50 | 7–2 | Hawkins Arena (626); Macon, GA |
| December 13, 2025*; 3:00 pm, ACCNX | | at Clemson | L 63–70 | 7–3 | Littlejohn Coliseum (6,129); Clemson, SC |
| December 17, 2025*; 7:00 pm, ESPN+ | | at UCF | L 63–81 | 7–4 | Addition Financial Arena (5,195); Orlando, FL |
| December 20, 2025*; 5:00 pm, ESPN+ | | at Washington State | L 78–84 | 7–5 | Beasley Coliseum (2,374); Pullman, WA |
| December 28, 2025*; 2:00 pm, ESPN+ | | Baptist (FL) | W 122–49 | 8–5 | Hawkins Arena (459); Macon, GA |
SoCon regular season
| December 31, 2025; 12:00 p.m., ESPN+ | | at Furman | L 72–74 | 8–6 (0–1) | Timmons Arena (2,117); Greenville, SC |
| January 3, 2026; 4:00 p.m., ESPN+ | | at East Tennessee State | L 71–77 | 8–7 (0–2) | Freedom Hall Civic Center (3,122); Johnson City, TN |
| January 7, 2026; 7:00 pm, ESPN+ | | The Citadel | W 101–63 | 9–7 (1–2) | Hawkins Arena (1,433); Macon, GA |
| January 10, 2026; 2:00 pm, ESPN+ | | Wofford | W 109–97 | 10–7 (2–2) | Hawkins Arena (1,258); Macon, GA |
| January 15, 2026; 6:00 p.m., ESPN+ | | at VMI | W 77–67 | 11–7 (3–2) | Cameron Hall (1,276); Lexington, VA |
| January 17, 2026; 4:00 pm, ESPN+ | | at UNC Greensboro | W 102–92 | 12–7 (4–2) | First Horizon Coliseum (1,368); Greensboro, NC |
| January 21, 2026; 7:00 pm, ESPN+ | | Western Carolina | W 88–76 | 13–7 (5–2) | Hawkins Arena (1,084); Macon, GA |
| January 24, 2026; 11:00 am, ESPN+ | | at Wofford | L 77–80 | 13–8 (5–3) | Jerry Richardson Indoor Stadium (2,054); Spartanburg, SC |
| January 29, 2026; 7:00 pm, ESPN+ | | UNC Greensboro | W 95–77 | 14–8 (6–3) | Hawkins Arena (973); Macon, GA |
| January 31, 2026; 2:00 pm, ESPN+ | | VMI | W 95–81 | 15–8 (7–3) | Hawkins Arena (1,520); Macon, GA |
| February 5, 2026; 7:00 pm, ESPN+ | | at Chattanooga | L 75–79 | 15–9 (7–4) | McKenzie Arena (3,183); Chattanooga, TN |
| February 7, 2026; 6:00 pm, ESPN+ | | at Samford | L 49–69 | 15–10 (7–5) | Pete Hanna Center (1,521); Homewood, AL |
| February 11, 2026; 7:00 pm, ESPN+ | | Furman | W 69–64 | 16–10 (8–5) | Hawkins Arena; Macon, GA |
| February 14, 2026; 1:00 pm, ESPN+ | | at The Citadel | W 70–54 | 17–10 (9–5) | McAlister Field House (1,171); Charleston, SC |
| February 19, 2026; 7:00 pm, ESPN+ | | Chattanooga | L 90–94 | 17–11 (9–6) | Hawkins Arena (1,292); Macon, GA |
| February 21, 2026; 2:00 pm, ESPN+ | | Samford | W 89–86 | 18–11 (10–6) | Hawkins Arena (1,138); Macon, GA |
| February 25, 2026; 7:00 pm, ESPN+ | | at Western Carolina | L 74–78 | 18–12 (10–7) | Ramsey Center (1,970); Cullowhee, NC |
| February 28, 2026; 4:30 pm, ESPN+ | | East Tennessee State | W 82–76 | 19–12 (11–7) | Hawkins Arena (2,317); Macon, GA |
SoCon tournament
| March 7, 2026; 8:30 pm, ESPN+ | (4) | vs. (5) Western Carolina; Quarterfinals | L 73–77 | 19–13 | Harrah's Cherokee Center (4,768); Asheville, NC |
*Non-conference game. ^{#}Rankings from AP Poll. (#) Tournament seedings in parentheses. All times are in Eastern.
