= Bob Richey =

American basketball coach (born 1983)

Current position
- Title: Head coach
- Team: Furman
- Conference: SoCon
- Record: 209–95 (.688)

Biographical details
- Born: March 22, 1983 (age 43); New Orleans, Louisiana, U.S.
- Education: North Greenville ('06)

Coaching career (HC unless noted)
- 2006–2011: Charleston Southern (assistant)
- 2011–2017: Furman (assistant)
- 2017–present: Furman

Head coaching record
- Overall: 209–95 (.688)
- Tournaments: 1–2 (NCAA Division I); 0–2 (NIT); 0–1 (CIT)

Accomplishments and honors

Championships
- SoCon regular season (2023); 2 SoCon tournament (2023, 2026)

Robert McIntire Richey Jr. (born March 22, 1983) is an American college basketball coach and the head coach at Furman.

== Coaching career ==
Richey's coaching career began at Charleston Southern in 2006, where he served on Barclay Radebaugh's staff until 2011. He joined the Furman staff under Jeff Jackson in 2011, and was retained as an assistant coach under Niko Medved. He served in the role until 2017, when he was elevated to interim head coach after Medved accepted the head coaching position at Drake. Richey coached the Paladins in their 2017 CollegeInsider.com Postseason Tournament semifinal matchup, in which they fell to St. Peter's. Following the season, the interim tag was lifted and Richey became the 22nd head coach in Furman history.

Richey prioritizes the retention and development of his players, rather than the acquisition of talent. Under Richey's tutelage, Furman star Jalen Slawson blossomed into the 2023 Southern Conference Men's Basketball Player of the Year and became the first Furman basketball player drafted to the NBA since 1984. Richey's success has led to head coaching interviews with prominent NCAA programs, but thus far he has chosen to remain at Furman.

=== 2018–19 season ===
In his second season as head coach, Richey led the Paladins to wins over two teams that had reached the Final Four of the 2018 NCAA tournament: Loyola Chicago and defending national champion Villanova. Following a school-record 10–0 start, Furman became ranked in the AP Poll for the first time in program history and went on to be ranked for three consecutive weeks. Richey and the Paladins proceeded to win their first 12 games and finish with what was then a school-record 25 wins. Furman was ranked as high as 23rd in the AP poll and was invited to the National Invitation Tournament for the first time since 1991.

=== 2022–2023 season ===
After falling in the Southern Conference championship game the year before, Richey and the Paladins won the 2023 Southern Conference title and qualified for the NCAA tournament for the first time since 1980. Furman went on to shock 4th-ranked Virginia with a last-second steal and three-point shot in the school's second-ever NCAA tournament win, securing a school-record 28 wins and national recognition for Furman University.

== Head coaching record ==
Record table
Season	Team	Overall	Conference	Standing	Postseason
Furman Paladins (Southern Conference) (2017–present)
2016–17	Furman	0–1*			CIT Semifinals
2017–18	Furman	23–10	13–5	3rd	
2018–19	Furman	25–8	13–5	T–3rd	NIT First Round
2019–20	Furman	25–7	15–3	2nd	
2020–21	Furman	16–9	10–5	3rd	
2021–22	Furman	22–12	12–6	2nd	
2022–23	Furman	28–8	15–3	T–1st	NCAA Division I Round of 32
2023–24	Furman	17–16	10–8	T–5th	
2024–25	Furman	25–10	11–7	5th	NIT First Round
2025–26	Furman	22–13	10–8	T–5th	NCAA Division I Round of 64
2026–27	Furman	6–1	0–0		
Furman:		209–95 (.688)	109–50 (.686)		
Total:		209–95 (.688)			

*Niko Medved accepted Drake position; Richey coached CIT semifinal game.

== Personal life ==
Richey is a Christian. He is married to Jessica Richey, with whom he has three children.
