= Jeremiah Samarrippas =

American basketball coach

Current position
- Title: Assistant coach
- Team: Wofford Terriers
- Conference: SoCon

Playing career
- 2010–2012: SMU
- 2012–2014: Tennessee Tech

Coaching career (HC unless noted)
- 2014–2016: Lincoln Memorial (graduate assistant)
- 2016–2021: Lincoln Memorial (assistant)
- 2021–2025: Lincoln Memorial
- 2025–present: Wofford (assistant)

Head coaching record
- Overall: 105–25 (.808)

Accomplishments and honors

Championships
- 4 SAC regular season (2022–2025)

Awards
- SAC Coach of the Year (2022)

Jeremiah Samarrippas is an American college basketball coach is an assistant coach for the Wofford Terriers. He was previously the head coach of the Lincoln Memorial Railsplitters.

== Early life and playing career ==
Samarrippas grew up in Bartow, Florida and attended Bartow High School. He began his college basketball career at SMU and became the Mustangs' starting point guard early in his freshman season. Despite having been a team captain as a sophomore, Samarrippas was cut by new head coach Larry Brown shortly after he was hired. He transferred to Tennessee Tech to continue his college career.

== Coaching career ==
Samarrippas began his coaching career as a graduate assistant at Lincoln Memorial in 2014, turning down an offer to play professional basketball overseas. He was hired as a full time assistant by head coach Josh Schertz in 2016. Samarrippas was hired as the Railsplitters' head coach on April 6, 2021 after Schertz took the head coaching position at Indiana State. Samarrippas' contract was not renewed after the 2024–25 despite having a 105-25 record and winning the South Atlantic Conference regular season title in all four of his seasons as head coach.

Samarrippas was hired as an assistant at Wofford.

== Head coaching record ==
Statistics overview
| Season | Team | Overall | Conference | Standing | Postseason |
|---|---|---|---|---|---|
Lincoln Memorial (South Atlantic Conference) (2021–2025)
| 2021–22 | Lincoln Memorial | 26–5 | 21–3 | 1st | NCAA Division II Second Round |
| 2022–23 | Lincoln Memorial | 30–5 | 16–2 | 1st | NCAA Division II Elite Eight |
| 2023–24 | Lincoln Memorial | 24–9 | 16–4 | T–1st | NCAA Division II First Round |
| 2024–25 | Lincoln Memorial | 25–6 | 21–3 | 1st | NCAA Division II First Round |
| Lincoln Memorial: | | 105–25 (.808) | 74–12 (.860) | | |
| Total: | | 105–25 (.808) | | | |
National champion Postseason invitational champion Conference regular season champion Conference regular season and conference tournament champion Division regular season champion Division regular season and conference tournament champion Conference tournament champion
