= Jadin Booth =

American basketball player (born 2002)

No. 20 – Rio Grande Valley Vipers
- Position: Point guard
- League: NBA G League

Personal information
- Born: August 26, 2002 (age 24) Omaha, Nebraska, U.S.
- Listed height: 6 ft 2 in (1.88 m)
- Listed weight: 185 lb (84 kg)

Career information
- High school: Westside (Omaha, Nebraska)
- College: Omaha (2020–2021); Florida Southern (2021–2025); Samford (2025–2026)
- NBA draft: 2026: undrafted
- Playing career: 2026–present

Career history
- 2026–present: Rio Grande Valley Vipers

Career highlights
- SoCon Player of the Year (2026); First-team All-SoCon (2026); 2× First-team All-SSC (2023, 2025)

Jadin Booth (born August 26, 2002) is an American basketball player for the Rio Grande Valley Vipers of the NBA G League. He played college basketball player for the Omaha Mavericks, Florida Southern Moccasins and Samford Bulldogs.

== High school career ==
Booth attended Westside High School in Omaha, Nebraska. He was named Second Team All-State as a junior after averaging 19.1 points, 4.0 rebounds and 3.4 assists per game. As a senior, Booth averaged 21.8 points per game and set Westside's scoring record with 1,634 points.

== College career ==
Booth began his collegiate career at Omaha and averaged 5.1 points, 1.2 rebounds and 1.2 assists per game as a freshman. He transferred to Florida Southern for his sophomore season. In the 2024–25 season, Booth averaged 17.2 points, 3.8 rebounds and 3.7 assists per game. He entered the transfer portal after the season, and committed to Samford despite receiving interest from Creighton, Ole Miss, and Minnesota. Booth averaged 21.6 points and 3.7 rebounds per game, and posted 40 points against UNC Greensboro. He was named SoCon Player of the Year.
