= Bodford Arena =

Arena in Greensboro, North Carolina

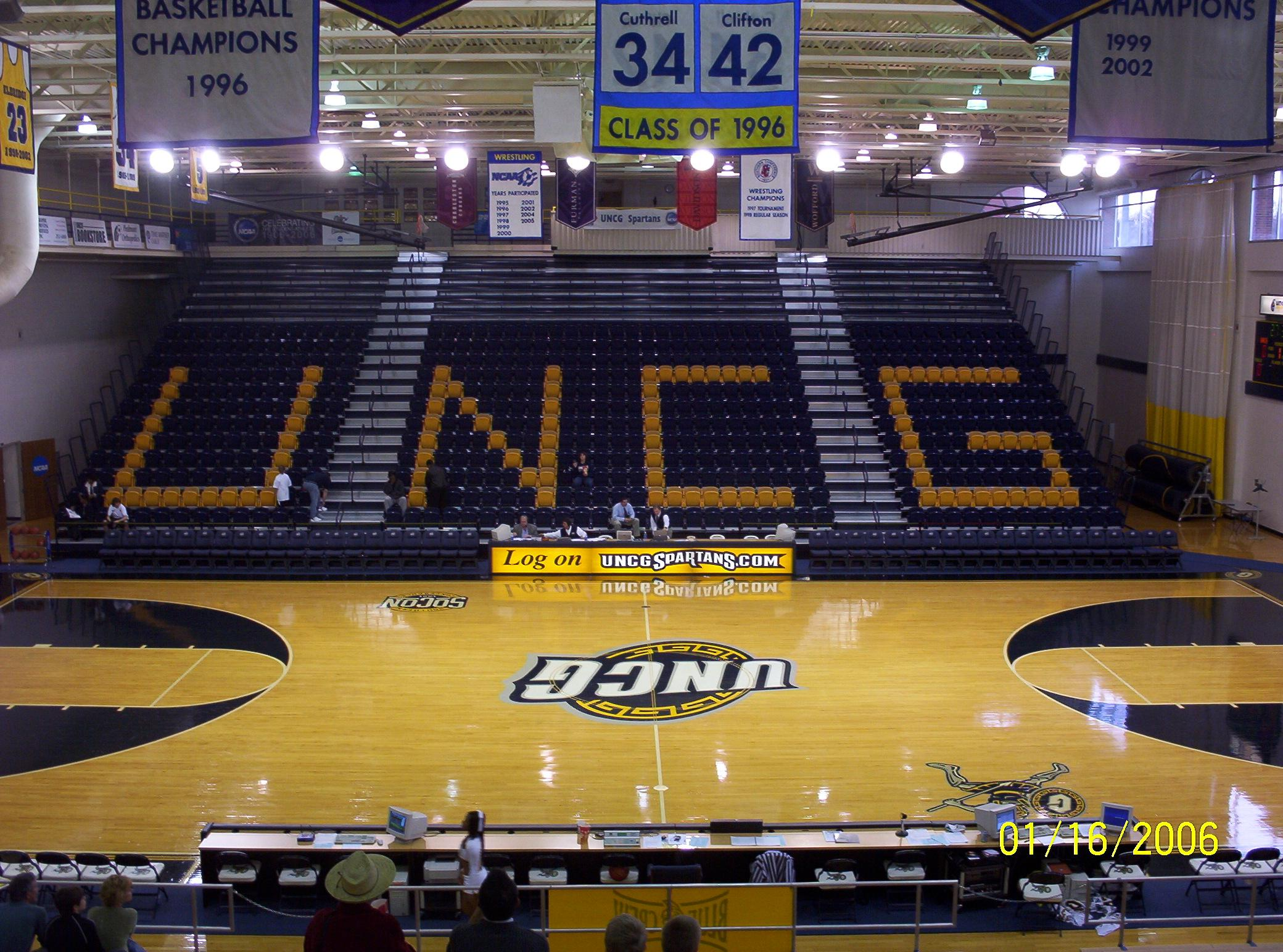
- Inside of the arena in 2006

- Location within North Carolina Location within the United States
- Interactive map of Bodford Arena
- Former names: Fleming Gymnasium (1994–2025)
- Address: 1000 Spring Garden Street; Greensboro, North Carolina; United States
- Coordinates: 36.069384°N 79.81268°W
- Capacity: 1,800 (basketball); 1,200 (volleyball)
- Record attendance: 2,302 (vs Charleston Southern, February 25, 1995)

Construction
- Opened: June 1989; 37 years ago
- Cost: $16.2 million

Tenants
- UNC Greensboro Spartans men's basketball (1989–2009, alternate 2009–present); UNC Greensboro Spartans women's basketball (1989–present); UNC Greensboro Spartans volleyball (1989–present)

Website
- Bodford Arena

Bodford Arena (formerly known as the Michael B. Fleming Gymnasium) is a 2,320-seat multi-purpose arena in Greensboro, North Carolina. It is located in the Mary Channing Coleman Building, a $16.2 million facility that opened on the University of North Carolina at Greensboro's (UNCG) campus in June 1989. The Coleman Building street address is 1000 Spring Garden Street, Greensboro, North Carolina.

Bodford Arena is home to the UNCG Volleyball and Women's Basketball teams. It was formerly the full-time home of the UNCG Men's Basketball team, but beginning in the 2009–10 basketball season the Spartans moved to larger Greensboro Coliseum for most of their games. The Spartan Men's Basketball team plays a few games every season at Bodford Arena.

Prior to the 2006–2007 season, Bodford Arena underwent a facelift to improve seating amenities. The renovated seating includes chairback seating on the lower half with bleacher bench seating in the upper half. The renovation also included updated team locker rooms and meeting areas for film breakdown and other activities in the Coleman Building.

== History ==
The arena, which has seating for more than 1,800 for basketball and 1,200 for volleyball and once wrestling was first occupied during the 1989-90 academic year and was informally called Spectator Gymnasium The gymnasium was named after Michael. B Fleming on December 1, 1994. Fleming was a Greensboro civic leader and one of the most ardent supporters of UNCG athletics.

On November 8, 2025, the facility was renamed Bodford Arena in recognition of a $2 million contribution from the Bodford family. The gift—the largest unrestricted donation in the history of UNCG Athletics and the first associated with naming an athletic competition facility—was intended to strengthen the university’s athletic programs and student-athlete experience.

The largest crowd to see an athletic contest in the arena was 2,302 for a men's basketball game against Charleston Southern on February 25, 1995. The Spartans won, 98–70.

Bodford Arena has played host to various conference championship tournaments, including Big South volleyball in 1994 and 1995, Big South women's basketball in 1994, Southern Conference (SoCon) women's basketball in 1998 and 1999, SoCon wrestling in 1999 and SoCon volleyball in 2001 and 2008. In 2005, it played host to the SoCon / ACC Wrestling Championships, also known as MatJam.

Prior to the 1996–97 season, the National Basketball Association (NBA)'s Boston Celtics held their preseason training camp in the gym.
