= 2020–21 Southern Conference men's basketball season =

- League: NCAA Division I
- Sport: Basketball
- Teams: 10

Regular season

Tournament

Southern Conference men's basketball seasons

2020–21 Southern Conference men's basketball standings
	Conf.				Overall
Team	W		L	PCT	W		L	PCT
UNC Greensboro †	13	–	5	.722	21	–	9	.700
Wofford	12	–	5	.706	15	–	9	.625
Furman	10	–	5	.667	16	–	9	.640
Chattanooga	9	–	7	.563	18	–	8	.692
East Tennessee State	8	–	7	.533	13	–	12	.520
VMI	7	–	7	.500	13	–	12	.520
Mercer	8	–	9	.471	18	–	11	.621
The Citadel	5	–	11	.313	13	–	12	.520
Western Carolina	4	–	13	.235	11	–	16	.407
Samford	2	–	9	.182	6	–	13	.316
† 2021 SoCon tournament winner

The 2020–21 Southern Conference men's basketball season began with practices in October 2020, followed by the start of the 2020–21 NCAA Division I men's basketball season in November. Conference play begins in January 2021 and will conclude in March 2021.

== Preseason Awards ==
Preseason awards were announced by the league office on November 11, 2020.

=== Preseason men's basketball coaches poll ===
(First place votes in parentheses)

1. UNC Greensboro (4) 76
2. Furman (5) 74
3. East Tennessee State (1) 63
4. Mercer 56
5. Wofford 47
6. Western Carolina 44
7. Chattanooga 38
8. Samford 23
9. VMI 15
10. The Citadel 14

=== Preseason men's basketball media poll ===
(First place votes in parentheses)

1. Furman (16) 278
2. UNC Greensboro (9) 274
3. East Tennessee State (4) 211
4. Mercer (1) 190
5. Wofford 184
6. Western Carolina 175
7. Chattanooga 150
8. Samford 79
9. VMI 61
10. The Citadel 48

Honor	Recipient
Preseason Player of the Year	Isaiah Miller, UNC Greensboro
Preseason All-Southern Conference Team	Ledarrius Brewer, East Tennessee State
Preseason All-Southern Conference Team	Ty Brewer, East Tennessee State
Preseason All-Southern Conference Team	Mike Bothwell, Furman
Preseason All-Southern Conference Team	Noah Gurley, Furman
Preseason All-Southern Conference Team	Clay Mounce, Furman
Preseason All-Southern Conference Team	Ross Cummings, Mercer
Preseason All-Southern Conference Team	Jeff Gary, Mercer
Preseason All-Southern Conference Team	Isaiah Miller, UNC Greensboro
Preseason All-Southern Conference Team	David Jean-Baptiste, Chattanooga
Preseason All-Southern Conference Team	Mason Faulkner, Western Carolina
Preseason All-Southern Conference Team	Storm Murphy, Wofford

== Conference matrix ==
	Chattanooga	East Tennessee State	Furman	Mercer	Samford	The Citadel	UNC Greensboro	VMI	Western Carolina	Wofford
vs. Chattanooga	–	0−2	1−0	1−1	0−2	1−1	2−0	1−0	0−2	1–1
vs. East Tennessee State	2–0	–	1−1	1−1	0−0	1−1	1−1	0−1	0−2	1–1
vs. Furman	0−1	1−1	–	0−2	0−1	0−2	1−1	1−0	0−2	1–0
vs. Mercer	1–1	1−1	2−0	–	0−2	0−2	2−0	0−1	1−1	2−0
vs. Samford	2–0	0−0	1−0	2−0	–	0−0	2−0	1−1	0−1	1−0
vs. The Citadel	1−1	1−1	2−0	2−0	0−0	–	2−0	1−1	1−1	1−1
vs. UNC Greensboro	0−2	1−1	1−1	0−2	0−2	0−2	–	1−1	1−1	1–1
vs. VMI	0−1	1−0	0−1	1−0	1−1	1−1	1−1	–	1−1	1–1
vs. Western Carolina	2–0	2−0	2−0	1−1	1−0	1−1	1−1	1−1	–	2–0
vs. Wofford	1−1	1−1	0−1	0−2	0−1	1−1	1−1	1−1	0−2	–
Total	9−7	8−7	10−4	8−9	2−9	5−11	13−5	7−7	4−13	11−5

== All-Southern Conference awards ==
=== Southern Conference men's basketball weekly awards ===
Week	Player(s) of the Week	School
Dec 1	Neftali Alvarez	Mercer
Dec 8	Myron Gordon	Samford
Dec 15	Myron Gordon (2)	Samford
Dec 22	Malachi Smith	Chattanooga
Jan 5	Mike Bothwell	Furman
Jan 12	Hayden Brown	The Citadel
Jan 19	Greg Parham	VMI
Jan 26	Greg Parham (2)	VMI
Feb 2	Damari Monsanto	ETSU
Feb 9	Jake Stephens	VMI
Feb 16	Hayden Brown (2)	The Citadel
Feb 23	Noah Gurley	Furman
Mar 2	Isaiah Miller	UNC Greensboro
