= 2020–21 Samford Bulldogs men's basketball team =

American college basketball season

2020–21 Samford Bulldogs men's basketball
- Conference: Southern Conference
- Record: 6–13 (2–9 SoCon)
- Head coach: Bucky McMillan (1st season)
- Associate head coach: Duane Reboul
- Assistant coaches: Tra Arnold; Sergio Rouco; Gerald Gillion
- Home arena: Pete Hanna Center

2020–21 Southern Conference men's basketball standings
	Conf.				Overall
Team	W		L	PCT	W		L	PCT
UNC Greensboro †	13	–	5	.722	21	–	9	.700
Wofford	12	–	5	.706	15	–	9	.625
Furman	10	–	5	.667	16	–	9	.640
Chattanooga	9	–	7	.563	18	–	8	.692
East Tennessee State	8	–	7	.533	13	–	12	.520
VMI	7	–	7	.500	13	–	12	.520
Mercer	8	–	9	.471	18	–	11	.621
The Citadel	5	–	11	.313	13	–	12	.520
Western Carolina	4	–	13	.235	11	–	16	.407
Samford	2	–	9	.182	6	–	13	.316
† 2021 SoCon tournament winner

The 2020–21 Samford Bulldogs men's basketball team represented Samford University in the 2020–21 NCAA Division I men's basketball season. The Bulldogs, led by first-year head coach Bucky McMillan, played their home games at the Pete Hanna Center in Homewood, Alabama as members of the Southern Conference.

== Previous season ==
The Bulldogs finished the 2019–20 season 10–23, 4–14 in SoCon play to finish in eighth place. They lost in the first round of the SoCon tournament to VMI.

On March 16, 2020, the school announced that head coach Scott Padgett had been fired. On April 6, the school announced it had hired high school coach Bucky McMillan as the Bulldogs' new head coach.

== Roster ==
2020–21 Samford Bulldogs men's basketball team
Players
Coaches

Pos.	#	Name	Height	Weight	Year	Hometown
G	0	Triston Chambers	6 ft 2 in (1.88 m)	185 lb (84 kg)	RS Sr	Cold Springs, Alabama
G	2	K.J. Davis	6 ft 6 in (1.98 m)	185 lb (84 kg)	RS Jr	Portsmouth, Virginia
G	3	Jaron Rillie	6 ft 3 in (1.91 m)	175 lb (79 kg)	Fr	Santa Barbara, California
G	4	Myron Gordon	6 ft 3 in (1.91 m)	180 lb (82 kg)	RS Sr	Bordentown, New Jersey
G	5	A.J. Staton-McCray	6 ft 5 in (1.96 m)	190 lb (86 kg)	Fr	Charlotte, North Carolina
G	10	Preston Parks	6 ft 1 in (1.85 m)	175 lb (79 kg)	GS	Greenville, South Carolina
G	11	Marcellus Vail	6 ft 2 in (1.88 m)	175 lb (79 kg)	Fr	Shelbyville, Kentucky
G	12	Clay Holmes	6 ft 2 in (1.88 m)	195 lb (88 kg)	Fr	Brentwood, Tennessee
G	13	Quinn Richey	6 ft 5 in (1.96 m)	195 lb (88 kg)	So	Johns Creek, Georgia
G	14	Richardson Maitre	6 ft 3 in (1.91 m)	180 lb (82 kg)	RS Sr	Montreal, Quebec, Canada
F	15	Grayson Walters	6 ft 5 in (1.96 m)	185 lb (84 kg)	Fr	Mountain Brook, Alabama
F	21	Luke Champion	6 ft 8 in (2.03 m)	175 lb (79 kg)	Fr	Suwanee, Georgia
F	22	Logan Dye	6 ft 8 in (2.03 m)	235 lb (107 kg)	Jr	Haleyville, Alabama
G	23	Christian Guess	6 ft 6 in (1.98 m)	190 lb (86 kg)	Jr	Cleveland, Ohio
F	24	Jalen Dupree	6 ft 8 in (2.03 m)	235 lb (107 kg)	RS Sr	Cordova, Tennessee
F	31	Bryan Smith	6 ft 4 in (1.93 m)	180 lb (82 kg)	So	Pismo Beach, California
C	34	Jacob Tryon	6 ft 11 in (2.11 m)	210 lb (95 kg)	Sr	Temecula, California
F	35	Stanley Henderson, Jr.	6 ft 6 in (1.98 m)	210 lb (95 kg)	RS So	Jonesboro, Georgia

Head coach

- Bucky McMillan (Birmingham–Southern)

Assistant coach(es)

- Duane Reboul (New Orleans)
- Tra Arnold (Biola)
- Sergio Rouco (Nova Southeastern)
- Gerald Gillion (Florida State)

Legend

- (C) Team captain
- (S) Suspended
- (I) Ineligible
- (W) Walk-on
- Injured
- Current redshirt

Roster
Last update: December 15, 2020

== Schedule and results ==
Date time, TV	Rank^{#}	Opponent^{#}	Result	Record	Site (attendance) city, state
Exhibition
November 25, 2020*; 7:00 pm, ESPN+		Greenville	W 174–99		Pete Hanna Center; Homewood, AL
Non-conference regular season
November 29, 2020*; 2:00 pm, ESPN+		Alabama A&M	L 76–78	0–1	Pete Hanna Center (680); Homewood, AL
December 1, 2020*; 7:00 pm, ESPN+		Covenant	W 98–73	1–1	Pete Hanna Center (260); Homewood, AL
December 5, 2020*; 4:00 pm, ESPN+		at Belmont	W 96–83	2–1	Curb Event Center; Nashville, TN
December 12, 2020*; 6:00 pm, SECN+		at Georgia	L 75–79	2–2	Stegeman Coliseum (1,638); Athens, GA
December 16, 2020*; 6:00 pm, ESPN+		at Troy	L 71–79	2–3	Trojan Arena (897); Troy, AL
December 19, 2020*; 4:30 pm, ESPN+		at Kennesaw State	W 65–63	3–3	KSU Convocation Center; Kennesaw, GA
December 21, 2020*; 7:00 pm, ESPN+		Belhaven	W 133–84	4–3	Pete Hanna Center (425); Homewood, AL
SoCon regular season
December 30, 2020; 7:00 pm, ESPN+		VMI	W 84–71	5–3 (1–0)	Pete Hanna Center (451); Homewood, AL
January 2, 2021; 6:00 pm, ESPN+		at Wofford	L 84–94	5–4 (1–1)	Jerry Richardson Indoor Stadium; Spartanburg, SC
January 6, 2021; 6:00 pm, ESPN+		at Chattanooga	L 68–73	5–5 (1–2)	McKenzie Arena; Chattanooga, TN
January 9, 2021		Western Carolina	Postponed		Pete Hanna Center; Homewood, AL
January 13, 2021		at East Tennessee State	Postponed		Freedom Hall Civic Center; Johnson City, TN
January 14, 2021; 7:00 pm, ESPN+		UNC Greensboro	L 63–87	5–6 (1–3)	Pete Hanna Center (451); Homewood, AL
January 16, 2021; 3:00 pm, ESPN+		UNC Greensboro	L 70–82	5–7 (1–4)	Pete Hanna Center (465); Homewood, AL
January 18, 2021; 2:00 pm, ESPN+		Western Carolina rescheduled from January 9	W 82–78	6–7 (2–4)	Pete Hanna Center (351); Homewood, AL
January 20, 2021; 7:00 pm, ESPN+		Chattanooga	L 64–70	6–8 (2–5)	Pete Hanna Center (512); Homewood, AL
January 23, 2021; 2:00 pm, ESPN+		The Citadel	Cancelled		Pete Hanna Center; Homewood, AL
January 27, 2021; 6:00 pm, ESPN+		at Mercer	Postponed		Hawkins Arena; Macon, GA
January 30, 2021; 1:00 pm, ESPN+		at Western Carolina	Cancelled		Ramsey Center; Culoowhee, NC
February 1, 2021; 7:00 pm, ESPN+		at East Tennessee State rescheduled from January 13	Cancelled		Freedom Hall Civic Center; Johnson City, TN
February 3, 2021; 7:00 pm, ESPN+		Furman	Cancelled		Pete Hanna Center; Homewood, AL
February 8, 2021; 1:00 pm, ESPN+		at Mercer rescheduled from January 27	L 82–89 ^{2OT}	6–9 (2–6)	Hawkins Arena (617); Macon, GA
February 10, 2021; 7:00 pm, ESPN+		Mercer	L 70–77 ^{OT}	6–10 (2–7)	Pete Hanna Center (651); Homewood, AL
February 13, 2021; 12:00 pm, ESPN+		at VMI	L 56–85	6–11 (2–8)	Cameron Hall; Lexington, VA
February 17, 2021; 6:00 pm, ESPN+		at Furman	L 64–78	6–12 (2–9)	Timmons Arena (250); Greenville, SC
February 20, 2021; 7:00 pm, ESPN+		East Tennessee State	Cancelled		Pete Hanna Center; Homewood, AL
February 22, 2021; 6:00 pm, ESPNU		Wofford	Cancelled		Pete Hanna Center; Homewood, AL
February 27, 2021; 1:00 pm, ESPN+		at The Citadel	Cancelled		McAlister Field House; Charleston, SC
SoCon tournament
March 5, 2021; 8:00 pm, ESPN+	(10)	vs. (7) Mercer; First Round	L 59–87	6–13	Harrah's Cherokee Center; Asheville, NC
*Non-conference game. ^{#}Rankings from AP Poll. (#) Tournament seedings in parentheses. All times are in Central.
