= 2020–21 Mercer Bears men's basketball team =

American college basketball season

2020–21 Mercer Bears men's basketball
- Conference: Southern Conference
- Record: 18–11 (8–9 SoCon)
- Head coach: Greg Gary (2nd season)
- Assistant coaches: Bobby Kummer; Kim Lewis; D.J. Byrd
- Home arena: Hawkins Arena

2020–21 Southern Conference men's basketball standings
	Conf.				Overall
Team	W		L	PCT	W		L	PCT
UNC Greensboro †	13	–	5	.722	21	–	9	.700
Wofford	12	–	5	.706	15	–	9	.625
Furman	10	–	5	.667	16	–	9	.640
Chattanooga	9	–	7	.563	18	–	8	.692
East Tennessee State	8	–	7	.533	13	–	12	.520
VMI	7	–	7	.500	13	–	12	.520
Mercer	8	–	9	.471	18	–	11	.621
The Citadel	5	–	11	.313	13	–	12	.520
Western Carolina	4	–	13	.235	11	–	16	.407
Samford	2	–	9	.182	6	–	13	.316
† 2021 SoCon tournament winner

The 2020–21 Mercer Bears men's basketball team represented Mercer University during the 2020–21 NCAA Division I men's basketball season. The team were led by second-year head coach Greg Gary, and played their home games at Hawkins Arena in Macon, Georgia as a member of the Southern Conference.

== Previous season ==
The Bears finished the 2019–20 season 17–15, 11–7 in SoCon play to finish in fourth place. They lost in the quarterfinals of the SoCon tournament to Western Carolina.

== Roster ==
2020–21 Mercer Bears men's basketball team
Players
Coaches

Pos.	#	Name	Height	Weight	Year	Hometown
G	0	Leon Ayers III	6 ft 6 in (1.98 m)	180 lb (82 kg)	Jr	Troy, Michigan
G	1	Kamar Robertson	6 ft 2 in (1.88 m)	160 lb (73 kg)	So	Alpharetta, Georgia
G	2	Neftali Alvarez	6 ft 2 in (1.88 m)	165 lb (75 kg)	RS So	Cataño, Puerto Rico
G	3	Jeff Gary	6 ft 4 in (1.93 m)	180 lb (82 kg)	RS Jr	Austin, Texas
F	5	Drew Thomas	6 ft 7 in (2.01 m)	185 lb (84 kg)	Fr	Smyrna, Georgia
C	10	Shannon Grant	6 ft 10 in (2.08 m)	280 lb (127 kg)	Fr	Sylacauga, Alabama
G	11	Jovan Tucker	6 ft 3 in (1.91 m)	175 lb (79 kg)	Fr	Atlanta, Georgia
G	12	Mitch Prendergast	6 ft 0 in (1.83 m)	190 lb (86 kg)	RS Jr	Dallas, Texas
C	14	Victor Bafutto	6 ft 10 in (2.08 m)	230 lb (104 kg)	RS Jr	Brasília, Brazil
F	15	John Treanor	6 ft 6 in (1.98 m)	210 lb (95 kg)	Fr	Roswell, Georgia
G	20	Ross Cummings	6 ft 3 in (1.91 m)	180 lb (82 kg)	RS Sr	Dickson, Tennessee
F	22	Felipe Haase	6 ft 9 in (2.06 m)	253 lb (115 kg)	RS Jr	Osorno, Chile
F	23	James Glisson III	6 ft 6 in (1.98 m)	210 lb (95 kg)	So	Decatur, Georgia
F	25	Maciej Bender	6 ft 11 in (2.11 m)	255 lb (116 kg)	RS Sr	Warsaw, Poland
G	30	Diego Rivera	6 ft 2 in (1.88 m)	180 lb (82 kg)	So	Bayamón, Puerto Rico
G	31	Jackson Greco	6 ft 3 in (1.91 m)	150 lb (68 kg)	Fr	Canton, Georgia
F	35	Patrick Urey	6 ft 6 in (1.98 m)	210 lb (95 kg)	RS So	Chattanooga, Tennessee

Head coach

- Greg Gary (Tulane)

Assistant coach(es)

- Bobby Kummer (Charlotte)
- Kim Lewis (Tulane)
- D.J. Byrd (Purdue)

Legend

- (C) Team captain
- (S) Suspended
- (I) Ineligible
- (W) Walk-on
- Injured
- Current redshirt

Roster
Last update: December 16, 2020

== Schedule and results ==
Date time, TV	Rank^{#}	Opponent^{#}	Result	Record	Site (attendance) city, state
Regular season
November 25, 2020*; 1:00 p.m., ESPN+		North Georgia	W 79–48	1–0	Hawkins Arena (727); Macon, GA
November 27, 2020*; 8:00 p.m., FSS		at Georgia Tech	W 83–73	2–0	McCamish Pavilion (1,200); Atlanta, GA
November 30, 2020*; 7:00 p.m., ESPN+		Georgia State	W 86–69	3–0	Hawkins Arena (672); Macon, GA
December 5, 2020*; 10:00 a.m., ESPN+		Columbia International	W 88–62	4–0	Hawkins Arena (478); Macon, GA
December 6, 2020*; 2:00 p.m., ESPN+		Southern Wesleyan	W 96–85	5–0	Hawkins Arena (727); Macon, GA
December 13, 2020*; 6:00 p.m., ESPN+		at Georgia Southern	W 77–75	6–0	Hanner Fieldhouse (459); Statesboro, GA
December 16, 2020*; 6:00 p.m., ESPN+		at Georgia State	L 81–88	6–1	GSU Sports Arena (907); Atlanta, GA
December 19, 2020*; 2:00 p.m.		Georgia Southwestern	Canceled		Hawkins Arena; Macon, GA
December 22, 2020*; 2:00 p.m., ESPN+		at Kennesaw State	W 81–71	7–1	KSU Convocation Center (341); Kennesaw, GA
December 29, 2020; 7:00 p.m., ESPNU		Wofford	L 65–78	7–2 (0–1)	Hawkins Arena (946); Macon, GA
January 2, 2021; 2:00 p.m., ESPN+		at Furman	L 80–83	7–3 (0–2)	Timmons Arena (250); Greenville, SC
January 13, 2021; 7:00 p.m., ESPN+		at Chattanooga	L 80–83	7–4 (0–3)	McKenzie Arena (0); Chattanooga, TN
January 16, 2021; 2:00 p.m., ESPN+		Western Carolina	W 78–76	8–4 (1–3)	Hawkins Arena (1,027); Macon, GA
January 20, 2021; 7:00 p.m., ESPN+		at The Citadel	W 83–63	9–4 (2–3)	McAlister Field House; Charleston, SC
January 23, 2021; 2:00 p.m., ESPN+		VMI	W 83–80	10–4 (3–3)	Hawkins Arena (927); Macon, GA
January 27, 2021; 7:00 p.m., ESPN+		at UNC Greensboro	L 68–81	10–5 (3–4)	Greensboro Coliseum; Greensboro, NC
January 30, 2021; 7:00 p.m., ESPN+		at Wofford	L 69–72	10–6 (3–5)	Jerry Richardson Indoor Stadium; Spartanburg, SC
February 3, 2021; 7:00 p.m., ESPN+		East Tennessee State	L 64–70	10–7 (3–6)	Hawkins Arena (927); Macon, GA
February 6, 2021; 2:00 p.m., ESPN+		Samford	W 89–82	11–7 (4–6)	Hawkins Arena; Macon, GA
February 10, 2021; 8:00 p.m., ESPN+		at Samford	W 77–70	12–7 (5–6)	Pete Hanna Center; Homewood, AL
February 13, 2021; 2:00 p.m., ESPN+		UNC Greensboro	L 74–77	12–8 (5–7)	Hawkins Arena; Macon, GA
February 17, 2021; 7:00 p.m., ESPN+		at East Tennessee State	W 71–64	13–8 (6–7)	Freedom Hall Civic Center; Johnson City, TN
February 20, 2021; 2:00 p.m., ESPN+		Furman	L 60–70	13–9 (6–8)	Hawkins Arena; Macon, GA
February 22, 2021; 7:00 p.m., ESPN+		The Citadel	W 88–52	14–9 (7–8)	Hawkins Arena; Macon, GA
February 24, 2021; 7:00 p.m., ESPN+		Chattanooga	W 81–77	15–9 (8–8)	Hawkins Arena; Macon, GA
February 27, 2021; 1:00 p.m., ESPN+		at Western Carolina	L 61–85	15–10 (8–9)	Ramsey Center; Cullowhee, NC
SoCon tournament
March 5, 2021; 8:00 pm, ESPN+	(7)	vs. (10) Samford; First Round	W 87–59	16–10	Harrah's Cherokee Center; Asheville, NC
March 6, 2021; 5:30 pm, ESPN+	(7)	vs. (2) Wofford; Quarterfinals	W 62–61	17–10	Harrah's Cherokee Center; Asheville, NC
March 7, 2021; 7:30 pm, ESPN+	(7)	vs. (6) VMI; Semifinals	W 73–59	18–10	Harrah's Cherokee Center; Asheville, NC
March 8, 2021; 7:00 pm, ESPN	(7)	vs. (1) UNC Greensboro; Championship	L 61–69	18–11	Harrah's Cherokee Center; Asheville, NC
*Non-conference game. ^{#}Rankings from AP Poll. (#) Tournament seedings in parentheses. All times are in Eastern.
