= 2020–21 East Tennessee State Buccaneers men's basketball team =

American college basketball season

2020–21 East Tennessee State Buccaneers men's basketball
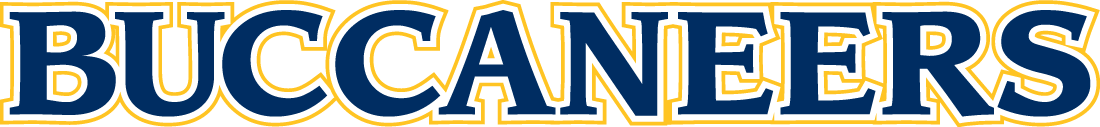
- Conference: Southern Conference
- Record: 13–12 (8–7 SoCon)
- Head coach: Jason Shay (1st season)
- Assistant coaches: Turner Battle; Greg Heiar; Matt Wise
- Home arena: Freedom Hall Civic Center

2020–21 Southern Conference men's basketball standings
	Conf.				Overall
Team	W		L	PCT	W		L	PCT
UNC Greensboro †	13	–	5	.722	21	–	9	.700
Wofford	12	–	5	.706	15	–	9	.625
Furman	10	–	5	.667	16	–	9	.640
Chattanooga	9	–	7	.563	18	–	8	.692
East Tennessee State	8	–	7	.533	13	–	12	.520
VMI	7	–	7	.500	13	–	12	.520
Mercer	8	–	9	.471	18	–	11	.621
The Citadel	5	–	11	.313	13	–	12	.520
Western Carolina	4	–	13	.235	11	–	16	.407
Samford	2	–	9	.182	6	–	13	.316
† 2021 SoCon tournament winner

The 2020–21 East Tennessee State Buccaneers men's basketball team represented East Tennessee State University in the 2020–21 NCAA Division I men's basketball season. The Buccaneers, led by first-year head coach Jason Shay, played their home games at the Freedom Hall Civic Center in Johnson City, Tennessee, as members of the Southern Conference.

== Previous season ==
The Buccaneers finished the 2019–20 season 30–4, 16–2 in SoCon play to finish as the SoCon regular season champions. They defeated VMI, Western Carolina and Wofford to become champions of the SoCon tournament. They earned the SoCon's automatic bid to the NCAA tournament. However, the NCAA Tournament was cancelled amid the COVID-19 pandemic.

On April 30, 2020, head coach Steve Forbes resigned to become the head coach at Wake Forest. He finished at ETSU with a five-year record of 130–43.

== Roster ==
2020–21 East Tennessee State Buccaneers men's basketball team
Players
Coaches

Pos.	#	Name	Height	Weight	Year	Hometown
C	0	Silas Adheke	6 ft 8 in (2.03 m)	245 lb (111 kg)	GS	Lagos, Nigeria
G	1	Serrel Smith	6 ft 4 in (1.93 m)	175 lb (79 kg)	Jr	St. Petersburg, Florida
F	2	Paul Smith	6 ft 8 in (2.03 m)	245 lb (111 kg)	Fr	Upper Marlboro, Maryland
G	3	Truth Harris	6 ft 1 in (1.85 m)	175 lb (79 kg)	Fr	Mount Vernon, New York
G	4	David Sloan	6 ft 0 in (1.83 m)	180 lb (82 kg)	Sr	Louisville, Kentucky
G	5	Marcus Niblack	6 ft 1 in (1.85 m)	190 lb (86 kg)	Fr	Leesburg, Florida
G/F	11	Eric Hancik	6 ft 5 in (1.96 m)	205 lb (93 kg)	Jr	Chino Hills, California
F	12	Damari Monsanto	6 ft 6 in (1.98 m)	215 lb (98 kg)	RS Fr	Pembroke Pines, Florida
F	14	Ty Brewer	6 ft 9 in (2.06 m)	205 lb (93 kg)	Jr	Meridian, Mississippi
F	15	Richard Amaefule	6 ft 9 in (2.06 m)	230 lb (104 kg)	Fr	London, England
F/C	21	Ismael Valdez	6 ft 9 in (2.06 m)	200 lb (91 kg)	Jr	Bronx, New York
G	22	Morrell Schramm	6 ft 2 in (1.88 m)	210 lb (95 kg)	Fr	Cleveland, Tennessee
F	23	Vonnie Patterson	6 ft 4 in (1.93 m)	200 lb (91 kg)	Sr	Louisville, Kentucky
G	24	Jordan Coffin	6 ft 1 in (1.85 m)	190 lb (86 kg)	Sr	Knoxville, Tennessee
G	25	Ledarrius Brewer	6 ft 5 in (1.96 m)	190 lb (86 kg)	RS Jr	Meridian, Mississippi
F	33	Charlie Weber	6 ft 9 in (2.06 m)	215 lb (98 kg)	So	Owings, Maryland

Head coach

- Jason Shay (Western Illinois)

Assistant coach(es)

- Turner Battle (Buffalo)
- Greg Heiar (Mount St. Clare)
- Matt Wise (Transylvania)

Legend

- (C) Team captain
- (S) Suspended
- (I) Ineligible
- (W) Walk-on
- Injured
- Current redshirt

Roster
Last update: December 16, 2020

== Schedule and results ==
Date time, TV	Rank^{#}	Opponent^{#}	Result	Record	Site (attendance) city, state
Non-conference Regular season
November 25, 2020*; 11:00 am		vs. Abilene Christian; Gulf Coast Showcase	L 47–70	0–1	Hertz Arena (50); Estero, FL
November 26, 2020*; 2:00 pm		vs. Austin Peay; Gulf Coast Showcase	L 66–67	0–2	Hertz Arena (50); Estero, FL
November 27, 2020*; 11:00 am		vs. Middle Tennessee; Gulf Coast Showcase	W 57–43	1–2	Hertz Arena (50); Estero, FL
December 12, 2020*; 4:00 pm, ESPN+		UAB	L 61–65	1–3	Freedom Hall Civic Center (124); Johnson City, TN
December 15, 2020*; 7:00 pm, ESPN+		Gardner–Webb	W 65–60	2–3	Freedom Hall Civic Center (105); Johnson City, TN
December 17, 2020*; 7:00 pm, ESPN+		Columbia International	W 96–54	3–3	Freedom Hall Civic Center (102); Johnson City, TN
December 19, 2020*; 4:00 pm		Lee	W 62–53	4–3	Freedom Hall Civic Center; Johnson City, TN
December 22, 2020*; 7:30 pm, SECN		at Alabama	L 69–85	4–4	Coleman Coliseum (2,055); Tuscaloosa, AL
SoCon Regular season
December 30, 2020; 7:00 pm, ESPN+		Western Carolina	W 86–78	5–4 (1–0)	Freedom Hall Civic Center (618); Johnson City, TN
January 2, 2021; 5:00 pm, ESPN+		at UNC Greensboro	W 71–61	6–4 (2–0)	Greensboro Coliseum (150); Greensboro, NC
January 16, 2021; 4:00 pm, ESPNU		at Furman	L 66–78	6–5 (2–1)	Bon Secours Wellness Arena (250); Greenville, SC
January 18, 2021; 7:00 pm, ESPN+		VMI	W 92–81	7–5 (3–1)	Freedom Hall Civic Center (720); Johnson City, TN
January 20, 2021; 4:00 pm, ESPN+		at Western Carolina	W 59–48	8–5 (4–1)	Ramsey Center; Cullowhee, NC
January 23, 2021; 4:00 pm, ESPN+		Furman	W 71–62	9–5 (5–1)	Freedom Hall Civic Center; Johnson City, TN
January 30, 2021; 4:00 pm, ESPN+		The Citadel	W 112–84	10–5 (6–1)	Freedom Hall Civic Center (618); Johnson City, TN
February 1, 2021; 7:00 pm, ESPN+		Samford	Postponed		Freedom Hall Civic Center; Johnson City, TN
February 1, 2021; 7:00 pm, ESPN+		at Wofford	L 62–67	10–6 (6–2)	Jerry Richardson Indoor Stadium; Spartanburg, SC
February 3, 2021; 7:00 pm, ESPN+		at Mercer	W 70–64	11–6 (7–2)	Hawkins Arena (927); Macon, GA
February 6, 2021; 4:00 pm, ESPN+		Chattanooga	L 65–67	11–7 (7–3)	Freedom Hall Civic Center; Johnson City, TN
February 10, 2021; 7:00 pm, ESPN+		at The Citadel	L 71–79	11–8 (7–4)	McAlister Field House; Charleston, SC
February 13, 2021; 4:00 pm, ESPN+		Wofford	W 71–49	12–8 (8–4)	Freedom Hall Civic Center; Johnson City, TN
February 15, 2021; 7:00 pm, ESPN+		at Chattanooga	L 51–53	12–9 (8–5)	McKenzie Arena; Chattanooga, TN
February 17, 2021; 7:00 pm, ESPN+		Mercer	L 64–71	12–10 (8–6)	Freedom Hall Civic Center; Johnson City, TN
February 20, 2021; 8:00 pm, ESPN+		at Samford	Cancelled		Pete Hanna Center; Homewood, AL
February 24, 2021; 7:00 pm, ESPN+		at VMI	Cancelled		Cameron Hall; Lexington, VA
February 27, 2021; 4:00 pm, ESPN+		UNC Greensboro	L 74–85 ^{OT}	12–11 (8–7)	Freedom Hall Civic Center; Johnson City, TN
SoCon tournament
March 6, 2021; 2:30 pm, ESPN+	(5)	vs. (4) Chattanooga; Quarterfinals	W 63–53	13–11	Harrah's Cherokee Center; Asheville, NC
March 7, 2021; 5:00 pm, ESPNU	(5)	vs. (1) UNC Greensboro; Semifinals	L 65–77	13–12	Harrah's Cherokee Center; Asheville, NC
*Non-conference game. ^{#}Rankings from AP Poll. (#) Tournament seedings in parentheses. All times are in Eastern.
