= Jason Shay =

American college basketball coach

Current position
- Title: Assistant coach
- Team: Wake Forest
- Conference: ACC

Biographical details
- Born: February 15, 1973 (age 52); Galesburg, Illinois, U.S.

Playing career
- 1991–1995: Iowa
- Position: Guard

Coaching career (HC unless noted)
- 1999–2001: Mercyhurst College (assistant)
- 2003–2005: Milwaukee (assistant)
- 2005–2011: Tennessee (assistant)
- 2011–2013: Northwest Florida State (assistant)
- 2013–2015: North Dakota (assistant)
- 2015–2020: East Tennessee State (assistant)
- 2020–2021: East Tennessee State
- 2021–present: Wake Forest (assistant)

Administrative career (AD unless noted)
- 2001–2003: Milwaukee (DBO)

Head coaching record
- Overall: 13–12 (.520)

Jason Shay (born February 15, 1973) is an American college basketball coach. He is currently an assistant coach at Wake Forest. Shay is a former men's college basketball head coach for the East Tennessee State Buccaneers. Prior to East Tennessee State, Shay held assistant coaching stints at University of North Dakota, Northwest Florida State College, University of Tennessee, University of Wisconsin-Milwaukee and Mercyhurst (Pa.) College. Throughout those stops, Shay had a streak of helping lead teams to nine consecutive postseason berths at the Division I level, including Tennessee's first-ever trip to the Elite Eight in 2010 and a Sweet 16 run at Wisconsin-Milwaukee in 2005.

== Early life ==
A native of Galesburg, Illinois, Shay was a walk-on at the University of Iowa for Dr. Tom Davis where he earned his bachelor's degree in health promotion in 1995. Shay then graduated with a master's degree from Western Illinois University in 1998.

== Coaching career ==
=== Early career ===
Shay began his coaching career at Mercyhurst where he spent two years as an assistant coach and also assisted in the sports information office. Shay's first Division I assistant coaching job came at the University of Wisconsin-Milwaukee where he was first the director of basketball operations for two seasons (2001–03) before being elevated to a full-time assistant prior to the 2003–04 season. The Panthers advanced to the NCAA Tournament in both of his seasons as an assistant coach before the staff moved on to Tennessee for the 2005–06 season. During his tenure in Knoxville, the Volunteers advanced to six consecutive NCAA Tournaments, which included the Elite Eight run in 2010. The Volunteers also won the outright Southeastern Conference Championship in 2008 – for the first time in 41 years – and UT averaged more than 25 wins per season during his time on the staff, including grabbing the No. 1 ranking for the first time in program history in 2008. Following a six-year stint as an assistant coach at the University of Tennessee, he spent two seasons at Northwest Florida State College in Niceville, Florida. During his time at Northwest Florida, the Raiders went 62–6, while winning consecutive Panhandle Conference Championships and back-to-back appearances in the NJCAA Division I National Championship game. He was also an assistant at University of North Dakota from 2013 to 2015.

=== East Tennessee State ===
Shay spent the five seasons as the ETSU Buccaneers’ assistant coach where ETSU compiled an overall record of 130–43. The 130 wins are the most over a five-year run in program history, while ranking 15th nationally since the start of the 2015–16 season. The Bucs also won two Southern Conference regular season championships, two SoCon Tournament championships and made two NCAA Tournament appearances. This past season, the Buccaneers set a program-record with 30 wins, becoming just the fourth team in SoCon history to accomplish the feat. In 2017–18, the Blue and Gold tied the school record by winning 16 straight games – a streak that was the longest in the country at one point that season. He helped ETSU finish with a school-record 30–4 in 2019–20.

On May 6, 2020, Shay was named the new head coach of the East Tennessee State men's basketball team. He was the 17th head coach in the program's 100-year history, and was hired after former coach Steve Forbes left for Wake Forest.

On March 30, 2021 Shay resigned as head men’s basketball coach at ETSU.

== Head coaching record ==
=== NCAA DI ===
Statistics overview
Season	Team	Overall	Conference	Standing	Postseason
East Tennessee State (Southern Conference) (2020–2021)
2020–21	East Tennessee State	13–12	8–7	5th	
East Tennessee State:		13–12 (.520)	8–7 (.533)		
Total:		13–12 (.520)			
National champion Postseason invitational champion Conference regular season champion Conference regular season and conference tournament champion Division regular season champion Division regular season and conference tournament champion Conference tournament champion

== Personal life ==
Shay and his wife, Jana, have a daughter, Peija; and a son Joah. Shay is the brother of Bettendorf High School athletics director Zach Shay.
