= 2020–21 Chattanooga Mocs men's basketball team =

American college basketball season

2020–21 Chattanooga Mocs men's basketball
- Conference: Southern Conference
- Record: 18–8 (9–7 SoCon)
- Head coach: Lamont Paris (4th season)
- Assistant coaches: Tanner Bronson; Eddie Shannon; David McKinley
- Home arena: McKenzie Arena

2020–21 Southern Conference men's basketball standings
	Conf.				Overall
Team	W		L	PCT	W		L	PCT
UNC Greensboro †	13	–	5	.722	21	–	9	.700
Wofford	12	–	5	.706	15	–	9	.625
Furman	10	–	5	.667	16	–	9	.640
Chattanooga	9	–	7	.563	18	–	8	.692
East Tennessee State	8	–	7	.533	13	–	12	.520
VMI	7	–	7	.500	13	–	12	.520
Mercer	8	–	9	.471	18	–	11	.621
The Citadel	5	–	11	.313	13	–	12	.520
Western Carolina	4	–	13	.235	11	–	16	.407
Samford	2	–	9	.182	6	–	13	.316
† 2021 SoCon tournament winner

The 2020–21 Chattanooga Mocs men's basketball team represented the University of Tennessee at Chattanooga in the 2020–21 NCAA Division I men's basketball season. The Mocs, led by fourth-year head coach Lamont Paris, played their home games at McKenzie Arena in Chattanooga, Tennessee, as members of the Southern Conference.

== Previous season ==
The Mocs finished the season 20–13, 10–8 in SoCon play to finish in a tie for fifth place. They defeated UNC Greensboro in the quarterfinals of the SoCon tournament before losing in the semifinals to Wofford.

== Roster ==
2020–21 Chattanooga Mocs men's basketball team
Players
Coaches

Pos.	#	Name	Height	Weight	Year	Hometown
G	0	A.J. Caldwell	6 ft 5 in (1.96 m)	200 lb (91 kg)	RS Jr	Sarasota, Florida
G	2	Jamaal Walker	6 ft 5 in (1.96 m)	185 lb (84 kg)	RS Fr	Chattanooga, Tennessee
G	3	David Jean-Baptiste	6 ft 1 in (1.85 m)	193 lb (88 kg)	RS Sr	Miami, Florida
G	10	Alex Tostado	6 ft 3 in (1.91 m)	180 lb (82 kg)	RS Jr	Guadalajara, Mexico
F	11	Mark Tikhonenko	6 ft 9 in (2.06 m)	238 lb (108 kg)	RS Jr	Moscow, Russia
G	12	Ashton Smith	5 ft 8 in (1.73 m)	163 lb (74 kg)	So	Memphis, Tennessee
G	13	Malachi Smith	6 ft 4 in (1.93 m)	205 lb (93 kg)	RS So	Belleville, Illinois
G/F	14	Grant Ledford	6 ft 5 in (1.96 m)	208 lb (94 kg)	So	Knoxville, Tennessee
F	21	Josh Ayeni	6 ft 7 in (2.01 m)	209 lb (95 kg)	GS	Zaria, Nigeria
G	23	Trey Doomes	6 ft 3 in (1.91 m)	171 lb (78 kg)	Jr	Acworth, Georgia
F	24	Prosper Obidiebube	6 ft 8 in (2.03 m)	208 lb (94 kg)	So	Lagos, Nigeria
F	25	Jaden Frazier	6 ft 9 in (2.06 m)	215 lb (98 kg)	RS Fr	Pulaski, Virginia
F	33	Stefan Kenić	6 ft 9 in (2.06 m)	223 lb (101 kg)	Sr	Belgrade, Serbia
F		Darius Banks	6 ft 6 in (1.98 m)	218 lb (99 kg)	Sr	St. Petersburg, Florida
F		KC Hankton	6 ft 7 in (2.01 m)	217 lb (98 kg)	Jr	Charlotte, North Carolina

Head coach

- Lamont Paris (Wooster)

Assistant coach(es)

- Tanner Bronson (Wisconsin)
- Eddie Shannon (Florida)
- David McKinley (Ohio)

Legend

- (C) Team captain
- (S) Suspended
- (I) Ineligible
- (W) Walk-on
- Injured
- Current redshirt

Roster
Last update: November 24, 2020

== Schedule and results ==
Date time, TV	Rank^{#}	Opponent^{#}	Result	Record	Site (attendance) city, state
Non-conference Regular season
November 25, 2020*; 2:00 pm, ESPN+		Lander	W 99–63	1–0	McKenzie Arena; Chattanooga, TN
November 30, 2020*; 7:00 pm, ESPN+		at Tennessee Tech	W 62–54	2–0	Gentry Complex (644); Nashville, TN
December 5, 2020*; 2:00 pm, ESPN+		Northern Kentucky	W 79–72	3–0	McKenzie Arena; Chattanooga, TN
December 7, 2020*; 7:00 pm		at Middle Tennessee	W 80–70	4–0	Murphy Center; Murfreesboro, TN
December 9, 2020*; 8:00 pm, ESPN+		at Bellarmine	W 77–68	5–0	Freedom Hall (853); Louisville, KY
December 12, 2020*; 2:00 pm, ESPN+		North Georgia	W 83–61	6–0	McKenzie Arena; Chattanooga, TN
December 16, 2020*; 7:00 pm, ESPN+		UNC Asheville	W 69–66	7–0	McKenzie Arena; Chattanooga, TN
December 19, 2020*; 3:00 pm		at UAB	W 69–66	8–0	Bartow Arena; Birmingham, AL
December 22, 2020*; 8:00 pm, ESPN+		at Tennessee State	W 66–63	9–0	Gentry Complex (147); Nashville, TN
SoCon Regular season
December 30, 2020; 1:00 pm, ESPN+		Furman	L 73–77	9–1 (0–1)	McKenzie Arena; Chattanooga, TN
January 2, 2021; 1:00 pm, ESPN+		at VMI	L 79–84	9–2 (0–2)	Cameron Hall (150); Lexington, VA
January 6, 2021; 7:00 pm, ESPN+		Samford	W 73–68	10–2 (1–2)	McKenzie Arena; Chattanooga, TN
January 9, 2021; 1:00 pm		at The Citadel	L 87–92	10–3 (1–3)	McAlister Field House (636); Charleston, SC
January 13, 2021; 7:00 pm, ESPN+		Mercer	W 83–80	11–3 (2–3)	McKenzie Arena; Chattanooga, TN
January 16, 2021; 2:00 pm, ESPN+		Wofford	L 59–77	11–4 (2–4)	McKenzie Arena; Chattanooga, TN
January 20, 2021; 8:00 pm, ESPN+		at Samford	W 70–64	12–4 (3–4)	Pete Hanna Center (512); Homewood, AL
January 23, 2021; 12:00 pm, ESPN+		UNC Greensboro	L 66–74	12–5 (3–5)	McKenzie Arena; Chattanooga, TN
January 30, 2021; 2:00 pm, ESPN+		at Furman	Cancelled		Bon Secours Wellness Arena; Greenville, SC
February 3, 2021; 7:00 pm, ESPN+		at Western Carolina	W 74–67	13–5 (4–5)	Ramsey Center; Cullowhee, NC
February 6, 2021; 4:00 pm, ESPN+		at East Tennessee State	W 67–65	14–5 (5–5)	Freedom Hall Civic Center; Johnson City, TN
February 10, 2021; 7:00 pm, ESPN+		at Wofford	W 78–66	15–5 (6–5)	Jerry Richardson Indoor Stadium; Spartanburg, SC
February 13, 2021; 12:00 pm, ESPN+		The Citadel	W 70–66	16–5 (7–5)	McKenzie Arena; Chattanooga, TN
February 15, 2021; 7:00 pm, ESPN+		East Tennessee State	W 53–51	17–5 (8–5)	McKenzie Arena; Chattanooga, TN
February 17, 2021; 7:00 pm, ESPN+		Western Carolina	W 89–81	18–5 (9–5)	McKenzie Arena; Chattanooga, TN
February 21, 2021; 5:00 pm, ESPN+		at UNC Greensboro	L 50–58	18–6 (9–6)	Greensboro Coliseum; Greensboro, NC
February 24, 2021; 7:00 pm, ESPN+		at Mercer	L 77–81	18–7 (9–7)	Hawkins Arena; Macon, GA
February 27, 2021; 7:00 pm, ESPN+		VMI	Cancelled		McKenzie Arena; Chattanooga, TN
SoCon tournament
March 6, 2021; 2:30 pm, ESPN+	(4)	vs. (5) East Tennessee State; Quarterfinals	L 53–63	18–8	Harrah's Cherokee Center; Asheville, NC
*Non-conference game. ^{#}Rankings from AP Poll. (#) Tournament seedings in parentheses. All times are in Eastern.

== See also ==
- 2020-21 Chattanooga Mocs women's basketball
