= 2020–21 Furman Paladins men's basketball team =

American college basketball season

2020–21 Furman Paladins men's basketball
- Conference: Southern Conference
- Record: 16–9 (10–5 SoCon)
- Head coach: Bob Richey (4th season)
- Assistant coaches: Jimmie Williams; Tim Johnson; Jeremy Growe
- Home arena: Timmons Arena; Bon Secours Wellness Arena

2020–21 Southern Conference men's basketball standings
	Conf.				Overall
Team	W		L	PCT	W		L	PCT
UNC Greensboro †	13	–	5	.722	21	–	9	.700
Wofford	12	–	5	.706	15	–	9	.625
Furman	10	–	5	.667	16	–	9	.640
Chattanooga	9	–	7	.563	18	–	8	.692
East Tennessee State	8	–	7	.533	13	–	12	.520
VMI	7	–	7	.500	13	–	12	.520
Mercer	8	–	9	.471	18	–	11	.621
The Citadel	5	–	11	.313	13	–	12	.520
Western Carolina	4	–	13	.235	11	–	16	.407
Samford	2	–	9	.182	6	–	13	.316
† 2021 SoCon tournament winner

The 2020–21 Furman Paladins men's basketball team represented Furman University in the 2020–21 NCAA Division I men's basketball season, led by fourth-year head coach Bob Richey. As members of the Southern Conference (SoCon), their home games were played at Timmons Arena and Bon Secours Wellness Arena in Greenville, South Carolina.

== Previous season ==
The Paladins finished the 2019–20 season with a 25–7 record, 15–3 in SoCon play, earning them a second-place finish. However, their season was cut short when they lost to Wofford in the quarterfinals of the SoCon tournament. Despite their 25 wins, which made them a strong candidate for postseason play, all postseason tournaments were cancelled amid the COVID-19 pandemic.

== Roster ==
2020–21 Furman Paladins men's basketball team
Players
Coaches

Pos.	#	Name	Height	Weight	Year	Hometown
G	1	Jaylon Pugh	6 ft 0 in (1.83 m)	173 lb (78 kg)	Jr	Cartersville, GA
G	2	Colin Kenney	6 ft 1 in (1.85 m)	172 lb (78 kg)	So	Michigan City, IN
G	3	Mike Bothwell	6 ft 3 in (1.91 m)	195 lb (88 kg)	Jr	Cleveland Heights, OH
F	4	Noah Gurley	6 ft 8 in (2.03 m)	210 lb (95 kg)	Jr	Fayetteville, GA
G	5	Marcus Foster	6 ft 4 in (1.93 m)	200 lb (91 kg)	RS Fr	Atlanta, GA
G	10	Alex Hunter	5 ft 11 in (1.8 m)	180 lb (82 kg)	Sr	Raleigh, NC
G	11	Robert Swanson	5 ft 10 in (1.78 m)	165 lb (75 kg)	Jr	Myrtle Beach, SC
F	12	Jonny Lawrence	6 ft 10 in (2.08 m)	205 lb (93 kg)	RS Fr	Orlando, FL
F	13	Garrett Hien	6 ft 9 in (2.06 m)	205 lb (93 kg)	Fr	Charlotte, NC
G	14	Rett Lister	6 ft 1 in (1.85 m)	167 lb (76 kg)	So	Easley, SC
F	20	Jalen Slawson	6 ft 7 in (2.01 m)	218 lb (99 kg)	Jr	Summerville, SC
F	21	Ben Beeker	6 ft 9 in (2.06 m)	225 lb (102 kg)	So	Hendersonville, NC
G	22	Joe Anderson	6 ft 0 in (1.83 m)	170 lb (77 kg)	Fr	Maryville, TN
F	45	Clay Mounce	6 ft 7 in (2.01 m)	210 lb (95 kg)	Sr	Elkin, NC

Head coach

- Bob Richey (North Greenville)

Assistant coach(es)

- Jimmie Williams (MNU)
- Tim Johnson (Wofford)
- Jeremy Growe (Indiana)

Legend

- (C) Team captain
- (S) Suspended
- (I) Ineligible
- (W) Walk-on
- Injured
- Current redshirt

Roster
Last update: December 10, 2020

== Schedule and results ==
Date time, TV	Rank^{#}	Opponent^{#}	Result	Record	Site (attendance) city, state
Non-conference regular season
November 25, 2020*; 4:00 p.m., ESPN+		Tusculum	W 95–62	1–0	Timmons Arena (250); Greenville, SC
November 28, 2020*; 2:00 p.m., ESPN+		USC Upstate	W 91–63	2–0	Timmons Arena (250); Greenville, SC
December 2, 2020*; 7:00 p.m., ESPN+		Southern Wesleyan	W 89–49	3–0	Timmons Arena (250); Greenville, SC
December 5, 2020*; 2:00 p.m., FloSports		at College of Charleston	W 81–57	4–0	TD Arena (1,453); Charleston, SC
December 9, 2020*; 5:00 p.m., SECN+		at Cincinnati	L 73–78	4–1	Fifth Third Arena; Cincinnati, OH
December 12, 2020*; 2:00 p.m., ESPN+		Flagler	W 86–61	5–1	Timmons Arena (250); Greenville, SC
December 15, 2020*; 9:00 p.m., SECN		at Alabama	L 80–83	5–2	Coleman Coliseum (2,055); Tuscaloosa, AL
December 19, 2020*; 4:00 p.m., ESPN+		at Winthrop	L 71–87	5–3	Winthrop Coliseum; Rock Hill, SC
December 21, 2020*; 7:00 p.m., ESPN+		South Carolina State	W 118–52	6–3	Timmons Arena (250); Greenville, SC
SoCon regular season
December 30, 2020; 1:00 p.m., ESPN+		at Chattanooga	W 77–73	7–3 (1–0)	McKenzie Arena; Chattanooga, TN
January 2, 2021; 2:00 p.m., ESPN+		Mercer	W 83–80	8–3 (2–0)	Timmons Arena (250); Greenville, SC
January 9, 2021; 2:00 p.m., ESPN+		VMI	Postponed		Timmons Arena; Charleston, SC
January 13, 2021; 7:00 p.m., ESPN+		at The Citadel	W 94–88	9–3 (3–0)	McAlister Field House; Charleston, SC
January 16, 2021; 4:00 p.m., ESPNU		East Tennessee State	W 78–66	10–3 (4–0)	Bon Secours Wellness Arena (250); Greenville, SC
January 20, 2021; 7:00 p.m., ESPN+		at VMI	L 73–74	10–4 (4–1)	Cameron Hall (210); Lexington, VA
January 23, 2021; 4:00 p.m., ESPN+		at East Tennessee State	L 61–72	10–5 (4–2)	Freedom Hall Civic Center (720); Johnson City, TN
January 30, 2021; 12:00 p.m., ESPN+		Chattanooga	Cancelled		Bon Secours Wellness Arena; Greenville, SC
January 30, 2021; 12:00 p.m., ESPN+		at Western Carolina	W 75–69	11–5 (5–2)	Ramsey Center; Cullowhee, NC
February 3, 2021; 8:00 p.m., ESPN+		at Samford	Cancelled		Pete Hanna Center; Homewood, AL
February 6, 2021; 4:00 p.m., ESPN+		Wofford	L 67–75	11–6 (5–3)	Bon Secours Wellness Arena; Greenville, SC
February 8, 2021; 5:00 p.m., ESPNU		UNC Greensboro	W 68–49	12–6 (6–3)	Timmons Arena; Greenville, SC
February 10, 2021; 5:00 p.m., ESPNU		at UNC Greensboro	L 58–64	12–7 (6–4)	Greensboro Coliseum; Greensboro, NC
February 13, 2021; 4:00 p.m., ESPN+		Western Carolina	W 88–70	13–7 (7–4)	Bon Secours Wellness Arena; Greenville, SC
February 17, 2021; 7:00 p.m., ESPN+		Samford	W 78–64	14–7 (8–4)	Timmons Arena (250); Greenville, SC
February 20, 2021; 2:00 p.m., ESPN+		at Mercer	W 70–60	15–7 (9–4)	Hawkins Arena; Macon, GA
February 22, 2020; 7:00 p.m.		at VMI	Cancelled		Timmons Arena; Greenville, SC
February 24, 2021; 7:00 p.m., ESPN+		The Citadel	W 72–63	16–7 (10–4)	Timmons Arena; Greenville, SC
February 27, 2021; 7:00 p.m., ESPN+		at Wofford	L 73–74	16–8 (10–5)	Jerry Richardson Indoor Stadium; Spartanburg, SC
SoCon tournament
March 6, 2021; 8:00 p.m., ESPN+	(3)	vs. (6) VMI; Quarterfinals	L 90–91 ^{OT}	16–9	Harrah's Cherokee Center; Asheville, NC
*Non-conference game. ^{#}Rankings from AP poll. (#) Tournament seedings in parentheses. All times are in Eastern.
