= 2020–21 UNC Greensboro Spartans men's basketball team =

American college basketball season

2020–21 UNC Greensboro Spartans men's basketball
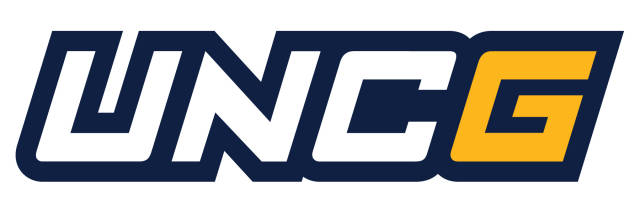

SoCon regular season and tournament champions

NCAA tournament, First Round
- Conference: Southern Conference
- Record: 21–9 (13–5 SoCon)
- Head coach: Wes Miller (10th season)
- Assistant coaches: Andre Gray; Kyle Bankhead; Chris LePore
- Home arena: Greensboro Coliseum Complex; Fleming Gymnasium

2020–21 Southern Conference men's basketball standings
	Conf.				Overall
Team	W		L	PCT	W		L	PCT
UNC Greensboro †	13	–	5	.722	21	–	9	.700
Wofford	12	–	5	.706	15	–	9	.625
Furman	10	–	5	.667	16	–	9	.640
Chattanooga	9	–	7	.563	18	–	8	.692
East Tennessee State	8	–	7	.533	13	–	12	.520
VMI	7	–	7	.500	13	–	12	.520
Mercer	8	–	9	.471	18	–	11	.621
The Citadel	5	–	11	.313	13	–	12	.520
Western Carolina	4	–	13	.235	11	–	16	.407
Samford	2	–	9	.182	6	–	13	.316
† 2021 SoCon tournament winner

The 2020–21 UNC Greensboro Spartans men's basketball team represented the University of North Carolina at Greensboro during the 2020–21 NCAA Division I men's basketball season. The Spartans, led by tenth-year head coach Wes Miller, play most of their home games at the Greensboro Coliseum in Greensboro, North Carolina, with a handful of games at Fleming Gymnasium, on the UNCG campus. They are members of the Southern Conference. They finished the season 21–8, 13–5 to finish in 1st place. They defeated The Citadel, East Tennessee State, and Mercer to win the SoCon Championship. They received an automatic bid to the NCAA Tournament where they lost in the Round of 64 to Florida State.

== Previous season ==
The Spartans finished the 2019–20 season 23–9, 13–3 in SoCon play to finish in third place. They lost in the quarterfinals of SoCon tournament to Chattanooga. Although being a good postseason candidate with 23 wins, all postseason tournaments were cancelled amid the COVID-19 pandemic.

Guard Isaiah Miller was named Southern Conference Men's Basketball Player of the Year, only the second Spartan to earn that honor. He was also named conference Defensive Player of the Year and named to the All-Southern Conference first-team, his second consecutive season for both. Senior forward James Dickey was named to the All-Southern Conference third-team and Freshman guard Keyshaun Langley was named to the All-Southern Conference Freshman Team.

== Roster ==
2020–21 UNC Greensboro Spartans men's basketball team
Players
Coaches

Pos.	#	Name	Height	Weight	Year	Hometown
G	0	Keyshaun Langley	6 ft 1 in (1.85 m)	190 lb (86 kg)	So	High Point, North Carolina
G	1	Isaiah Miller	6 ft 0 in (1.83 m)	190 lb (86 kg)	Sr	Covington, Georgia
G	2	A.J. McInnis	6 ft 3 in (1.91 m)	180 lb (82 kg)	Fr	Huntsville, Alabama
G	3	Kobe Langley	6 ft 1 in (1.85 m)	175 lb (79 kg)	So	High Point, North Carolina
F	4	Mohammed Abdulsalam	6 ft 9 in (2.06 m)	255 lb (116 kg)	RS Jr	Ibadan, Nigeria
G	11	Michael Hueitt, Jr.	6 ft 3 in (1.91 m)	185 lb (84 kg)	RS Jr	Fayetteville, North Carolina
F	12	Khyre Thompson	6 ft 6 in (1.98 m)	190 lb (86 kg)	RS So	Kernersville, North Carolina
F	13	Angelo Allegri	6 ft 7 in (2.01 m)	205 lb (93 kg)	Jr	Kansas City, Missouri
F	15	Dericko Williams	6 ft 8 in (2.03 m)	220 lb (100 kg)	RS Fr	Kinston, North Carolina
G	20	Reggie Raynor (W)	6 ft 4 in (1.93 m)	200 lb (91 kg)	Fr	Fayetteville, North Carolina
G	22	Arnas Adomavicius	6 ft 4 in (1.93 m)	200 lb (91 kg)	RS So	Vilnius, Lithuania
G	24	J.C Tharrington	6 ft 1 in (1.85 m)	180 lb (82 kg)	So	Charlotte, North Carolina
C	25	Hayden Koval	7 ft 1 in (2.16 m)	220 lb (100 kg)	Sr	Prosper, Texas
G	30	Ryan Tankelewicz (W)	5 ft 11 in (1.8 m)	170 lb (77 kg)	Jr	Raleigh, North Carolina
F	32	Jarrett Hensley	6 ft 8 in (2.03 m)	205 lb (93 kg)	Fr	Merriam, Kansas
F	33	Bas Leyte	6 ft 10 in (2.08 m)	220 lb (100 kg)	So	Bergen op Zoom, Netherlands
G	44	Kaleb Hunter	6 ft 4 in (1.93 m)	190 lb (86 kg)	RS Jr	Raleigh, North Carolina

Head coach

- Wes Miller (North Carolina)

Assistant coach(es)

- Chris LePore (Belmont)
- Andre Gray (Methodist)
- Kyle Bankhead (Gonzaga)

Legend

- (C) Team captain
- (S) Suspended
- (I) Ineligible
- (W) Walk-on
- Injured
- Current redshirt

Roster
Last update: September 24, 2020

== Schedule and results ==
Date time, TV	Rank^{#}	Opponent^{#}	Result	Record	High points	High rebounds	High assists	Site (attendance) city, state
Non-conference Regular season
November 27, 2020*; 7:00 pm, ESPN3		vs. Little Rock; Wade Houston Tip-off Classic	W 77–70	1–0	24 – Miller	7 – Abdulsalam	5 – Hunter	KFC Yum! Center; Louisville, KY
December 1, 2020*; 2:00 pm		vs. Prairie View A&M; Wade Houston Tip–off Classic	Cancelled due to COVID-19 Issues					KFC Yum! Center; Louisville, KY
December 1, 2020*; 8:30 pm, ESPN3		vs. Winthrop; Wade Houston Tip–off Classic	L 67–75	1–1	19 – Miller	10 – Hunter	6 – Ke. Langley	KFC Yum! Center; Louisville, KY
December 2, 2020*; 6:00 pm, ESPN3		vs. Duquesne; Wade Houston Tip–off Classic	L 68–81	1–2	22 – Miller	6 – Abdulsalam	4 – Miller	KFC Yum! Center; Louisville, KY
December 4, 2020*; 2:00 pm		at Louisville; Wade Houston Tip–off Classic	Cancelled due to COVID-19 Issues					KFC Yum! Center; Louisville, KY
December 10, 2020*; 7:00 pm, Ustream		at Coppin State	L 80–85	1–3	24 – Miller	9 – Miller	5 – Miller	Physical Education Complex; Baltimore, MD
December 11, 2020*; 7:00 pm		NC Wesleyan	Postponed due to Scheduling Issues					Greensboro Coliseum; Greensboro, NC
December 13, 2020*; 2:00 pm, ESPN+		Norfolk State	W 64–47	2–3	17 – Miller	10 – Hunter	5 – Miller	Greensboro Coliseum; Greensboro, NC
December 15, 2020*; 7:00 pm, ESPN+		USC Upstate	W 65–57	3–3	16 – Thompson	6 – Abdulsalam	5 – Ke. Langley	Greensboro Coliseum; Greensboro, NC
December 19, 2020*; 1:00 pm, MyNetworkTV		at Elon	W 71–64	4–3	21 – Ke. Langley	11 – Abdulsalam	3 – Ke. Langley	Schar Center; Elon, NC
December 22, 2020*; 6:00 pm, NCAggies.com		at North Carolina A&T; Battle of Market Street	W 86–65	5–3	15 – Abdulsalam	8 – Tied	9 – Ke. Langley	Corbett Sports Center; Greensboro, NC
SoCon regular season
January 2, 2020; 5:00 pm, ESPN+		East Tennessee State	L 61–71	5–4 (0–1)	24 – Miller	7 – Abdulsalam	3 – Tied	Greensboro Coliseum; Greensboro, NC
January 6, 2020; 7:00 pm, ESPN+		at Wofford	W 84–75	6–4 (1–1)	19 – Allegri	13 – Miller	8 – Miller	Jerry Richardson Indoor Stadium; Spartanburg, SC
January 9, 2020; 5:00 pm, ESPN+		Wofford	L 45–48	6–5 (1–2)	10 – Tied	9 – Miller	4 – Miller	Greensboro Coliseum; Greensboro, NC
January 14, 2020; 7:00 pm, ESPN+		at Samford	W 87–63	7–5 (2–2)	18 – Miller	9 – Abdulsalam	4 – Ko. Langley	Pete Hanna Center (451); Homewood, AL
January 16, 2020; 3:00 pm, ESPN+		at Samford	W 82–70	8–5 (3–2)	20 – Miller	7 – Miller	5 – Miller	Pete Hanna Center (465); Homewood, AL
January 18, 2020; 7:00 pm, ESPN+		The Citadel	W 87–73	9–5 (4–2)	30 – Miller	12 – Miller	5 – Ke. Langley	Greensboro Coliseum; Greensboro, NC
January 23, 2020; 12:00 pm, ESPN+		at Chattanooga	W 74–66	10–5 (5–2)	17 – Allegri	8 – Abdulsalam	4 – Ke. Langley	McKenzie Arena; Chattanooga, TN
January 27, 2020; 7:00 pm, ESPN+		Mercer	W 81–68	11–5 (6–2)	22 – Miller	8 – Allegri	6 – Ke. Langley	Greensboro Coliseum; Greensboro, NC
January 30, 2020; 7:00 pm, ESPN+		VMI	W 76–59	12–5 (7–2)	25 – Miller	9 – Abdulsalam	4 – Ke. Langley	Greensboro Coliseum; Greensboro, NC
February 3, 2020; 7:00 pm, ESPN+		at The Citadel	W 85–66	13–5 (8–2)	22 – Hunter	8 – Abdulsalam	7 – Miller	McAlister Field House (742); Charleston, SC
February 8, 2020; 5:00 pm, ESPNU		at Furman; Rescheduled from Jan. 25 due to Covid-19	L 49–68	13–6 (8–3)	14 – Miller	6 – Koval	2 – Ke. Langley	Timmons Arena; Greenville, SC
February 10, 2020; 5:00 pm, ESPNU		Furman	W 64–58	14–6 (9–3)	22 – Miller	8 – Miller	3 – Miller	Greensboro Coliseum; Greensboro, NC
February 13, 2020; 2:00 pm, ESPN+		at Mercer	W 77–74	15–6 (10–3)	16 – Allegri	10 – Abdulsalam	6 – Ke. Langley	Hawkins Arena; Macon, GA
February 17, 2020; 7:00 pm, ESPN+		at VMI	L 77–88	15–7 (10–4)	19 – Miller	8 – Koval	5 – Miller	Cameron Hall; Lexington, VA
February 20, 2020; 5:00 pm		Chattanooga	W 58-50	16–7 (11–4)	15 – Abdulsalam	11 – Miller	5 – Miller	Greensboro Coliseum; Greensboro, NC
February 22, 2020; 4:00 pm, ESPN+		at Western Carolina; Rescheduled from Jan. 13 due to Covid-19	W 77–56	17–7 (12–4)	15 – Tied	5 – Tied (3)	5 – Miller	Ramsey Center; Cullowhee, NC
February 24, 2020; 7:00 pm, ESPN+		Western Carolina	L 80–81	17–8 (12–5)	28 – Miller	16 – Abdulsalam	6 – Miller	Greensboro Coliseum; Greensboro, NC
February 27, 2020; 4:00 pm, ESPN+		at East Tennessee State	W 85–74 ^{OT}	18–8 (13–5)	32 – Miller	9 – Abdulsalam	7 – Miller	Freedom Hall Civic Center; Johnson City, TN
SoCon tournament
March 6, 2021; 12:00 pm, ESPN+	(1)	vs. (8) The Citadel; Quarterfinals	W 80–72	19–8	21 – Miller	6 – Tied	6 – Ke. Langley	Harrah's Cherokee Center; Asheville, NC
March 7, 2021; 5:00 pm, ESPNU	(1)	vs. (5) East Tennessee State; Semifinals	W 77–65	20–8	21 – Miller	7 – Miller	7 – Ke. Langley	Harrah's Cherokee Center; Asheville, NC
March 8, 2021; 7:00 pm, ESPN	(1)	vs. (7) Mercer; Championship	W 69–61	21–8	25 – Miller	12 – Miller	6 – Miller	Harrah's Cherokee Center; Asheville, NC
NCAA tournament
March 20, 2021; 12:45 pm, truTV	(13 E)	vs. (4 E) No. 14 Florida State; First Round	L 54–64	21–9	17 – Miller	5 – Tied (3)	4 – Miller	Bankers Life Fieldhouse; Indianapolis, IN
*Non-conference game. ^{#}Rankings from AP Poll. (#) Tournament seedings in parentheses. All times are in Eastern Time.

== Awards and honors ==
=== Southern Conference honors ===
==== Southern Conference Player of the Year ====
- Isaiah Miller

==== Southern Conference Defensive Player of the Year ====
- Isaiah Miller

==== All-SoCon First Team ====
- Isaiah Miller
