= 2020–21 The Citadel Bulldogs basketball team =

American college basketball season

2020–21 The Citadel Bulldogs basketball
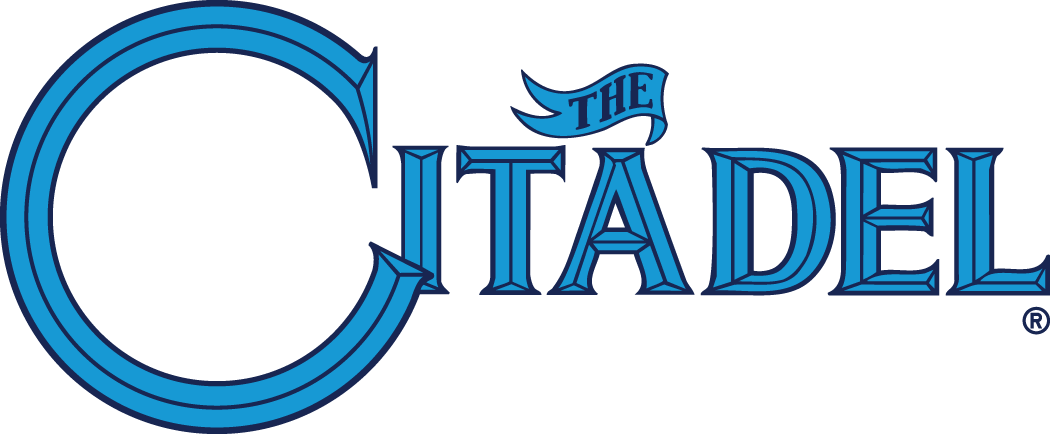
- Conference: Southern Conference
- Record: 13–12 (5–11 SoCon)
- Head coach: Duggar Baucom (6th season)
- Associate head coach: Jack Castleberry
- Assistant coaches: Josh Hayes; Brad Mason
- Home arena: McAlister Field House

2020–21 Southern Conference men's basketball standings
	Conf.				Overall
Team	W		L	PCT	W		L	PCT
UNC Greensboro †	13	–	5	.722	21	–	9	.700
Wofford	12	–	5	.706	15	–	9	.625
Furman	10	–	5	.667	16	–	9	.640
Chattanooga	9	–	7	.563	18	–	8	.692
East Tennessee State	8	–	7	.533	13	–	12	.520
VMI	7	–	7	.500	13	–	12	.520
Mercer	8	–	9	.471	18	–	11	.621
The Citadel	5	–	11	.313	13	–	12	.520
Western Carolina	4	–	13	.235	11	–	16	.407
Samford	2	–	9	.182	6	–	13	.316
† 2021 SoCon tournament winner

The 2020–21 The Citadel Bulldogs basketball team represented The Citadel, The Military College of South Carolina in the 2020–21 NCAA Division I men's basketball season. The Bulldogs, led by sixth-year head coach Duggar Baucom, played their home games at McAlister Field House in Charleston, South Carolina, as members of the Southern Conference (SoCon).

== Previous season ==
The Bulldogs finished the 2019–20 season 6–24, 0–18 in SoCon play, to finish in last place. They lost in the first round of the SoCon tournament to Wofford.

== Roster ==
2020–21 The Citadel Bulldogs men's basketball team
Players
Coaches

Pos.	#	Name	Height	Weight	Year	Hometown
F/C	1	Stephen Clark	6 ft 8 in (2.03 m)	200 lb (91 kg)	So	Charlotte, NC
G	2	Jackson Gammons	6 ft 3 in (1.91 m)	195 lb (88 kg)	RS Fr	High Point, NC
G	3	Rudy III Fitzgibbons	6 ft 0 in (1.83 m)	145 lb (66 kg)	So	Atlanta, GA
G	4	Robert Guyton	6 ft 0 in (1.83 m)	165 lb (75 kg)	Jr	Myrtle Beach, SC
G	5	Fletcher Abee	6 ft 3 in (1.91 m)	180 lb (82 kg)	So	Morganton, NC
G	11	Kaiden Rice	6 ft 7 in (2.01 m)	205 lb (93 kg)	Sr	Columbia, SC
G	12	Brent Davis	6 ft 3 in (1.91 m)	190 lb (86 kg)	Fr	Miramar, FL
G	13	Tyler Moffe	6 ft 1 in (1.85 m)	175 lb (79 kg)	GS	Elmira, NY
F/C	14	Brady Spence	6 ft 9 in (2.06 m)	200 lb (91 kg)	So	Douglasville, GA
G	15	Jerry III Higgins	5 ft 10 in (1.78 m)	175 lb (79 kg)	RS So	Cleveland, OH
F	23	Owen Spencer	6 ft 9 in (2.06 m)	205 lb (93 kg)	Fr	Cincinnati, OH
G	24	Dylan Engler	6 ft 5 in (1.96 m)	185 lb (84 kg)	Fr	Oswego, IL
F	32	Derek Jr. Webster	6 ft 4 in (1.93 m)	215 lb (98 kg)	Sr	Tampa, FL
F	33	Hayden Brown	6 ft 5 in (1.96 m)	225 lb (102 kg)	RS Jr	Greer, SC

Head coach

- Duggar Baucom (UNC Charlotte)

Assistant coach(es)

- Jack Castleberry (VMI)
- Josh Hayes (Methodist)
- Brad Mason (Texas Tech)

Legend

- (C) Team captain
- (S) Suspended
- (I) Ineligible
- (W) Walk-on
- Injured
- Current redshirt

Roster
Last update: December 10, 2020

== Schedule and results ==
Date time, TV	Rank^{#}	Opponent^{#}	Result	Record	Site (attendance) city, state
Non-conference regular season
November 25, 2020*; 3:00 p.m., ESPN+		Piedmont	W 89–64	1–0	McAlister Field House (450); Charleston, SC
December 3, 2020*; 7:00 p.m., ESPN+		North Carolina A&T	W 78–70	2–0	McAlister Field House (500); Charleston, SC
December 5, 2020*; 1:00 p.m., ESPN+		Toccoa Falls	W 100–58	3–0	McAlister Field House (337); Charleston, SC
December 7, 2020*; 7:00 p.m., ESPN+		Columbia International	W 96–57	4–0	McAlister Field House (463); Charleston, SC
December 9, 2020*; 7:00 p.m., ESPN+		Carver	W 102–51	5–0	McAlister Field House (515); Charleston, SC
December 19, 2020*; 12:30 p.m., ESPN+		at Longwood	W 91–89	6–0	Willett Hall (0); Farmville, VA
December 22, 2020*; 3:00 p.m., ESPN+		Presbyterian	W 94–82	7–0	McAlister Field House (785); Charleston, SC
SoCon regular season
December 30, 2020		UNC Greensboro	Postponed		McAlister Field House; Charleston, SC
January 2, 2021		at Western Carolina	Postponed		Ramsey Center; Cullowhee, NC
January 6, 2021		at Mercer	Postponed		Hawkins Arena; Macon, GA
January 9, 2021; 1:00 p.m.		Chattanooga	W 92–87	8–0 (1–0)	McAlister Field House (636); Charleston, SC
January 13, 2021; 7:00 p.m., ESPN+		Furman	L 88–94	8–1 (1–1)	McAlister Field House (0); Charleston, SC
January 16, 2021; 1:00 p.m., ESPN+		at VMI	L 103–110	8–2 (1–2)	Cameron Hall (250); Lexington, VA
January 18, 2021; 7:00 p.m., ESPN+		at UNC Greensboro	L 73–87	8–3 (1–3)	Greensboro Coliseum (0); Greensboro, NC
January 20, 2021; 5:00 p.m., ESPN+		Mercer	L 63–83	8–4 (1–4)	McAlister Field House (0); Charleston, SC
January 23, 2021; 3:00 p.m., ESPN+		at Samford	Postponed		Pete Hanna Center; Homewood, AL
January 27, 2021; 7:00 p.m., ESPN+		Wofford	W 77–69	9–4 (2–4)	McAlister Field House (0); Charleston, SC
January 30, 2021; 4:00 p.m., ESPN+		at East Tennessee State	L 84–112	9–5 (2–5)	Freedom Hall Civic Center (618); Johnson City, TN
February 1, 2021; 12:00 p.m., ESPN+		at Western Carolina; Rescheduled from January 2	L 75–76	9–6 (2–6)	Ramsey Center (0); Cullowhee, NC
February 3, 2021; 7:00 p.m., ESPN+		UNC Greensboro; Rescheduled from December 30	L 66–85	9–7 (2–7)	McAlister Field House (746); Charleston, SC
February 6, 2021; 1:00 p.m., ESPN+		Western Carolina	W 74–63	10–7 (3–7)	McAlister Field House (677); Charleston, SC
February 10, 2021; 7:00 p.m., ESPN+		East Tennessee State	W 79–71	11–7 (4–7)	McAlister Field House (516); Charleston, SC
February 13, 2021; 12:00 p.m., ESPN+		at Chattanooga	L 66–70	11–8 (4–8)	McKenzie Arena (971); Chattanooga, TN
February 17, 2021; 7:00 p.m., ESPN+		at Wofford	L 67–81	11–9 (4–9)	Jerry Richardson Indoor Stadium (0); Spartanburg, SC
February 20, 2021; 1:00 p.m., ESPN+		VMI	W 75–74	12–9 (5–9)	McAlister Field House (1,062); Charleston, SC
February 22, 2021; 7:00 p.m., ESPN+		at Mercer; Rescheduled from January 6	L 52–88	12–10 (5–10)	Hawkins Arena (1,435); Macon, GA
February 24, 2021; 7:00 p.m., ESPN+		at Furman	L 63–72	12–11 (5–11)	Timmons Arena (250); Greenville, SC
February 27, 2021; 1:00 p.m., ESPN+		Samford	Cancelled		McAlister Field House; Charleston, SC
SoCon tournament
March 5, 2021; 5:30 p.m., ESPN+	(8)	vs. (9) Western Carolina; First round	W 100–86	13–11	Harrah's Cherokee Center; Asheville, NC
March 6, 2021; 12:00 p.m., ESPN+	(8)	vs. (1) UNC Greensboro; Quarterfinals	L 72–80	13–12	Harrah's Cherokee Center; Asheville, NC
*Non-conference game. ^{#}Rankings from AP poll. (#) Tournament seedings in parentheses. All times are in Eastern.
