= 2020–21 Western Carolina Catamounts men's basketball team =

American college basketball season

2020–21 Western Carolina Catamounts men's basketball
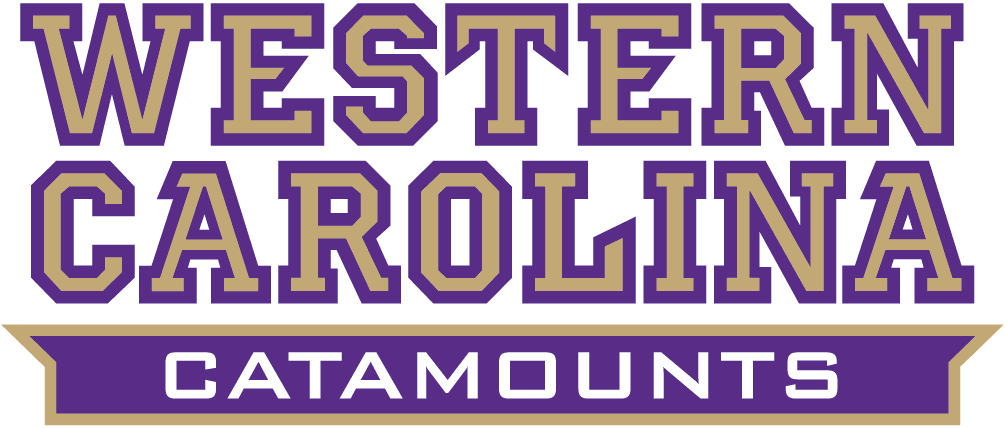
- Conference: Southern Conference
- Record: 11–16 (4–13 SoCon)
- Head coach: Mark Prosser (3rd season)
- Associate head coach: Tony Rack
- Assistant coaches: Ben Betts; Brett Ferguson
- Home arena: Ramsey Center

2020–21 Southern Conference men's basketball standings
	Conf.				Overall
Team	W		L	PCT	W		L	PCT
UNC Greensboro †	13	–	5	.722	21	–	9	.700
Wofford	12	–	5	.706	15	–	9	.625
Furman	10	–	5	.667	16	–	9	.640
Chattanooga	9	–	7	.563	18	–	8	.692
East Tennessee State	8	–	7	.533	13	–	12	.520
VMI	7	–	7	.500	13	–	12	.520
Mercer	8	–	9	.471	18	–	11	.621
The Citadel	5	–	11	.313	13	–	12	.520
Western Carolina	4	–	13	.235	11	–	16	.407
Samford	2	–	9	.182	6	–	13	.316
† 2021 SoCon tournament winner

The 2020–21 Western Carolina Catamounts men's basketball team represented Western Carolina University in the 2020–21 NCAA Division I men's basketball season. The Catamounts, led by third-year head coach Mark Prosser, played their home games at the Ramsey Center in Cullowhee, North Carolina, as members of the Southern Conference. They finished 11–16, 4–13 in Southern Conference play, to finish in ninth place. They were defeated by The Citadel in the first round of the Southern Conference tournament.

== Previous season ==
The Catamounts finished the 2019–20 season 19–12, 10–8 in Southern Conference play to finish in a tie for fifth place. They defeated Mercer in the quarterfinals of the Southern Conference tournament before losing in the semifinals to East Tennessee State.

== Offseason ==
=== Player departures ===
Name	Pos.	Height	Weight	Year	Hometown	Reason for departure
Carlos Dotson	F	6'7"	270	Senior	Riverdale, MD	Graduated
Onno Steger	F	6'5"	205	Senior	Upper Arlington, OH	Graduated
Jason McMillan	G	5'11"	160	Senior	Cherokee, NC	Graduated
D.J. Myers	F	6'6"	200	Sophomore	Raleigh, NC	Left team

=== Incoming transfers ===
Name	Pos.	Height	Weight	Year	Hometown	Previous school	Years remaining
Cory Hightower	F	6'7"	222	Junior	Flint, MI	Presbyterian	2

=== Recruiting class of 2020 ===
College recruiting information
Name	Hometown	School	Height	Weight	Commit date
Sin'Cere McMahon; G	Indianapolis, IN	Crispus Attuck High School	6 ft 1 in (1.85 m)	167 lb (76 kg)	
Sin'Cere McMahon; G	Recruit ratings: No ratings found				
Kennedy Miles; G	Burlington, NC	Williams High School	6 ft 1 in (1.85 m)	165 lb (75 kg)	
Kennedy Miles; G	Recruit ratings: No ratings found				
Josh Massey; G	Monroe, NC	United Faith Christian Academy	6 ft 6 in (1.98 m)	195 lb (88 kg)	
Josh Massey; G	Recruit ratings: No ratings found				
Daniel Ransom; F	Charlotte, NC	Vance High School	6 ft 5 in (1.96 m)	214 lb (97 kg)	
Daniel Ransom; F	Recruit ratings: No ratings found				
Brad Halvorsen; G	Kingsport, TN	Christ School (N.C.)	6 ft 0 in (1.83 m)	160 lb (73 kg)	
Brad Halvorsen; G	Recruit ratings: No ratings found				
Tyler McGhie; G	Denton, TX	Guyer High School	6 ft 5 in (1.96 m)	188 lb (85 kg)	
Tyler McGhie; G	Recruit ratings: No ratings found				
Overall recruit ranking:
Note: In many cases, Scout, Rivals, 247Sports, On3, and ESPN may conflict in their listings of height and weight.; In these cases, the average was taken. ESPN grades are on a 100-point scale.; Sources:

== Roster ==
2020–21 Western Carolina Catamounts men's basketball team
Players
Coaches

Pos.	#	Name	Height	Weight	Year	Hometown
G	0	Sin'Cere McMahon	6 ft 1 in (1.85 m)	167 lb (76 kg)	Fr	Indianapolis, IN
G	1	Travion McCray	6 ft 1 in (1.85 m)	187 lb (85 kg)	So	Timmonsville, SC
G	2	Matt Halvorsen	6 ft 1 in (1.85 m)	183 lb (83 kg)	Sr	Kingsport, TN
G	3	Kennedy Miles	6 ft 1 in (1.85 m)	165 lb (75 kg)	Fr	Burlington, NC
G/F	4	Tyler Harris	6 ft 7 in (2.01 m)	195 lb (88 kg)	So	Charlotte, NC
G	5	Josh Massey	6 ft 6 in (1.98 m)	195 lb (88 kg)	Fr	Monroe, NC
G/F	10	Douglas Elks	6 ft 5 in (1.96 m)	200 lb (91 kg)	RS Jr	Raleigh, NC
G	11	Mason Faulkner	6 ft 1 in (1.85 m)	190 lb (86 kg)	RS Sr	Glasgow, KY
F	12	Cory Hightower	6 ft 7 in (2.01 m)	222 lb (101 kg)	RS Jr	Flint, MI
F	13	Xavier Cork	6 ft 9 in (2.06 m)	235 lb (107 kg)	So	Sulphur Springs, TX
G	14	Kameron Gibson	6 ft 3 in (1.91 m)	192 lb (87 kg)	Jr	Cincinnati, OH
F	20	Daniel Ransom	6 ft 5 in (1.96 m)	214 lb (97 kg)	Fr	Charlotte, NC
G	21	Marcus Thomas	6 ft 3 in (1.91 m)	185 lb (84 kg)	Sr	Mint Hill, NC
G	22	Brad Halvorsen	6 ft 0 in (1.83 m)	160 lb (73 kg)	Fr	Kingsport, TN
G	24	Tyler McGhie	6 ft 5 in (1.96 m)	188 lb (85 kg)	Fr	Denton, TX
F	25	Ahmir Langlais	6 ft 9 in (2.06 m)	218 lb (99 kg)	RS Fr	Atlanta, GA

Head coach

- Mark Prosser (Marist)

Assistant coach(es)

- Tony Rack (Northern Kentucky)
- Ben Betts (Roanoke)
- Brett Ferguson (Michigan State)

Legend

- (C) Team captain
- (S) Suspended
- (I) Ineligible
- (W) Walk-on
- Injured
- Current redshirt

Roster

== Schedule and results ==
Date time, TV	Rank^{#}	Opponent^{#}	Result	Record	Site (attendance) city, state
Non-conference Regular season
November 25, 2020*; 4:00 pm, ESPN+		vs. UNC Wilmington; Mako Medical Asheville Classic	W 98–76	1–0	Kimmel Arena (0); Asheville, NC
November 27, 2020*; 1:00 pm, ESPN+		vs. Troy; Mako Medical Asheville Classic	L 64–66	1–1	Kimmel Arena (0); Asheville, NC
November 28, 2020*; 4:00 pm, ESPN+		at UNC Asheville; Mako Medical Asheville Classic	W 83–81 ^{OT}	2–1	Kimmel Arena (0); Asheville, NC
November 30, 2020*; 11:00 am, ESPN+		Piedmont	W 96–58	3–1	Ramsey Center (0); Cullowhee, NC
December 3, 2020*; 7:00 pm, ESPN+		Newberry	W 91–84	4–1	Ramsey Center (0); Cullowhee, NC
December 6, 2020*; 12:00 pm, ESPN+		Tennessee Tech	W 76–75 ^{OT}	5–1	Ramsey Center (0); Cullowhee, NC
December 12, 2020*; 4:00 pm		at North Carolina A&T	W 104–98 ^{OT}	6–1	Corbett Sports Center (0); Greensboro, NC
December 15, 2020*; 7:00 pm, ESPN+		at VCU	L 68–93	6–2	Siegel Center (250); Richmond, VA
December 18, 2020*; 6:30 pm		at College of Charleston	W 76–70 ^{OT}	7–2	TD Arena (1,471); Charleston, SC
SoCon Regular season
December 30, 2020; 7:00 pm		at East Tennessee State	L 78–86	7–3 (0–1)	Freedom Hall Civic Center (618); Johnson City, TN
January 2, 2021		The Citadel	Postponed due to COVID-19 issues		Ramsey Center; Cullowhee, NC
January 6, 2021		Furman	Postponed due to COVID-19 issues		Ramsey Center; Cullowhee, NC
January 9, 2021		at Samford	Postponed due to COVID-19 issues		Pete Hanna Center; Homewood, AL
January 13, 2021; 4:00 pm		UNC Greensboro	Postponed due to COVID-19 issues		Ramsey Center; Cullowhee, NC
January 16, 2021; 2:00 pm, ESPN+		at Mercer	L 76–78	7–4 (0–2)	Hawkins Arena (1,027); Macon, GA
January 18, 2021; 3:00 pm, ESPN+		at Samford; Rescheduled from January 9	L 78–82	7–5 (0–3)	Pete Hanna Center (351); Homewood, AL
January 20, 2021; 4:00 pm, ESPN+		East Tennessee State	L 48–59	7–6 (0–4)	Ramsey Center; Cullowhee, NC
January 23, 2021; 7:00 pm, ESPN+		at Wofford	L 78–91	7–7 (0–5)	Jerry Richardson Indoor Stadium; Spartanburg, SC
January 27, 2021; 7:00 pm, ESPN+		at VMI	L 61–87	7–8 (0–6)	Cameron Hall (225); Lexington, VA
January 30, 2021; 1:00 pm, ESPN+		Samford	Cancelled due to COVID-19 issues		Ramsey Center; Cullowhee, NC
January 30, 2021; 1:00 pm, ESPN+		Furman; Moved from February 15	L 69–75	7–9 (0–7)	Ramsey Center; Cullowhee, NC
February 1, 2021; 12:00 pm, ESPN+		The Citadel; Rescheduled from January 2	W 76–75	8–9 (1–7)	Ramsey Center; Cullowhee, NC
February 3, 2021; 7:00 pm, ESPN+		Chattanooga	L 67–74	8–10 (1–8)	Ramsey Center; Cullowhee, NC
February 6, 2021; 1:00 pm, ESPN+		at The Citadel	L 63–74	8–11 (1–9)	McAlister Field House; Charleston, SC
February 10, 2021; 7:00 pm, ESPN+		VMI	W 74–72	9–11 (2–9)	Ramsey Center; Cullowhee, NC
February 13, 2021; 12:00 pm, ESPN+		at Furman	L 70–78	9–12 (2–10)	Bon Secours Wellness Arena; Greenville, SC
February 17, 2021; 7:00 pm, ESPN+		at Chattanooga	L 81–89	9–13 (2–11)	McKenzie Arena; Chattanooga, TN
February 20, 2021; 1:00 pm, ESPN+		Wofford	L 56–80	9–14 (2–12)	Ramsey Center; Cullowhee, NC
February 22, 2021; 7:00 pm, ESPN+		UNC Greensboro; Rescheduled from January 13	L 56–77	9–15 (2–13)	Ramsey Center; Cullowhee, NC
February 24, 2021; 7:00 pm, ESPN+		at UNC Greensboro	W 81–80	10–15 (3–13)	Greensboro Coliseum; Greensboro, NC
February 27, 2021; 1:00 pm, ESPN+		Mercer	W 85–61	11–15 (4–13)	Ramsey Center; Cullowhee, NC
SoCon tournament
March 5, 2021; 5:30 pm, ESPN+	(9)	vs. (8) The Citadel; First round	L 86–100	11–16	Harrah's Cherokee Center; Asheville, NC
*Non-conference game. ^{#}Rankings from AP poll. (#) Tournament seedings in parentheses. All times are in Eastern.
