= 2020–21 Alabama Crimson Tide men's basketball team =

American college basketball season

2020–21 Alabama Crimson Tide men's basketball

SEC regular season & tournament champions

NCAA tournament, Sweet Sixteen
- Conference: Southeastern Conference

Ranking
- Coaches: No. 5
- AP: No. 5
- Record: 26–7 (16–2 SEC)
- Head coach: Nate Oats (2nd season)
- Assistant coaches: Bryan Hodgson (2nd season); Antoine Pettway (9th season); Charlie Henry (2nd season)
- Home arena: Coleman Coliseum

2020–21 Southeastern Conference men's basketball standings
	Conf.				Overall
Team	W		L	PCT	W		L	PCT
No. 5 Alabama†	16	–	2	.889	26	–	7	.788
No. 10 Arkansas	13	–	4	.765	25	–	7	.781
LSU	11	–	6	.647	19	–	10	.655
Tennessee	10	–	7	.588	18	–	9	.667
Florida	9	–	7	.563	15	–	10	.600
Ole Miss	10	–	8	.556	16	–	12	.571
Missouri	8	–	8	.500	16	–	10	.615
Kentucky	8	–	9	.471	9	–	16	.360
Mississippi State	8	–	10	.444	18	–	15	.545
Georgia	7	–	11	.389	14	–	12	.538
Auburn^{*}	7	–	11	.389	13	–	14	.481
South Carolina	4	–	12	.250	6	–	15	.286
Texas A&M	2	–	8	.200	8	–	10	.444
Vanderbilt	3	–	13	.188	9	–	16	.360
† 2021 SEC tournament winner^{*} Ineligible for postseason due to self-imposed postseason ban.

The 2020–21 Alabama Crimson Tide men's basketball team represented the University of Alabama in the 2020–21 NCAA Division I men's basketball season. The team was led by second-year head coach Nate Oats. They played their home games at Coleman Coliseum in Tuscaloosa, Alabama as a member of the Southeastern Conference. The Crimson Tide won the regular season Southeastern Conference Championship, marking the team's first championship since 2002. They also won the SEC tournament, their first win in that competition since 1991 and the first time since 1987 that the program won both the regular season and tournament.

The Tide were placed as a No. 2 seed in the East Region for the 2021 NCAA tournament, their highest placement since 2002. They would defeat Iona and Maryland before falling to a surging 11-seed UCLA in the Sweet Sixteen in overtime, 88–78 (that UCLA team made the Final Four). Alabama was ranked No. 5 in the final Coaches' Poll following the season, and Oats was named SEC Coach of the Year as well as being a finalist for National Coach of the Year honors.

== Previous season ==
The Crimson Tide finished the 2019–20 season 16–15, 8–10 in SEC play to finish in ninth place. They were set to take on Tennessee in the second round of the SEC tournament. However, the remainder of the SEC Tournament was cancelled amid the start of the COVID-19 pandemic.

== Offseason ==
=== Departures ===
Name	Number	Pos.	Height	Weight	Year	Hometown	Reason for departure
Javian Davis	0	F	6'9"	242	RS Freshman	Canton, MS	Transferred to Mississippi State
Kira Lewis Jr.	2	G	6'3"	165	Sophomore	Meridianville, AL	Declared for the 2020 NBA draft; selected 13th overall by the New Orleans Pelicans
James Bolden	11	G	6'0"	160	RS Senior	Covington, KY	Graduated
Jaylen Forbes	12	G	6'4"	186	Freshman	Florence, MS	Transferred to Tulane
Sam Okauru	34	G	6'5"	200	Freshman	Raleigh, NC	Walk On; Transferred
Raymond Hawkins	35	F/C	6'9"	240	Freshman	Oakland, CA	Transferred to Long Beach State

=== Incoming transfers ===
Name	Number	Pos.	Height	Weight	Year	Hometown	Previous School
Jordan Bruner	2	F	6'10"	225	Senior	Columbia, SC	Graduate transfer from Yale
Keon Ellis	14	G	6'6"	170	Junior	Eustis, FL	Junior College Transfer from Florida Southwestern State College.
Kendall Wall	30	F	6'5"	192	Senior	Columbia, SC	Walk On; Graduate transfer from Francis Marion University.

=== 2021 recruiting class ===
College recruiting information
Name	Hometown	School	Height	Weight	Commit date
JD Davison; PG	Letohatchee, Alabama	Calhoun School	6 ft 3 in (1.91 m)	195 lb (88 kg)	Oct 3, 2020
JD Davison; PG	Recruit ratings: Rivals: 247Sports: ESPN: (94)				
Charles Bediako; C	Brampton, Ontario	IMG Academy	7 ft 0 in (2.13 m)	225 lb (102 kg)	Jun 1, 2021
Charles Bediako; C	Recruit ratings: Rivals: 247Sports: ESPN: (88)				
Jusaun Holt; SG	Tacoma, Washington	St Francis Day School	6 ft 6 in (1.98 m)	190 lb (86 kg)	Sep 27, 2020
Jusaun Holt; SG	Recruit ratings: Rivals: 247Sports: ESPN: (82)				
Overall recruit ranking:
Note: In many cases, Scout, Rivals, 247Sports, On3, and ESPN may conflict in their listings of height and weight.; In these cases, the average was taken. ESPN grades are on a 100-point scale.; Sources: "2021 Alabama Commits". Rivals.; "ESPN- Alabama Crimson Tide Men's Basketball Recruiting". ESPN.; "2021 Team Ranking". Rivals.

== Preseason ==
=== SEC media poll ===
The SEC media poll was released on November 12, 2020.

Media poll
Predicted finish	Team
1	Tennessee
2	Kentucky
3	LSU
4	Florida
5	Alabama
6	Arkansas
7	Auburn
8	South Carolina
9	Ole Miss
10	Missouri
11	Texas A&M
12	Mississippi State
13	Georgia
14	Vanderbilt

=== Preseason All-SEC teams ===
The Crimson Tide had one player selected to the preseason all-SEC teams.

First Team

John Petty Jr.

== Roster ==
2020–21 Alabama Crimson Tide men's basketball team
Players
Coaches

Pos.	#	Name	Height	Weight	Year	Previous school	Hometown
G/F	1	Herbert Jones	6 ft 8 in (2.03 m)	210 lb (95 kg)	Sr	Hale County HS	Greensboro, AL
F	2	Jordan Bruner	6 ft 10 in (2.08 m)	225 lb (102 kg)	GS	Yale	Columbia, SC
F	3	Alex Reese	6 ft 9 in (2.06 m)	230 lb (104 kg)	Sr	Pelham HS	Pelham, AL
F	4	Juwan Gary	6 ft 6 in (1.98 m)	218 lb (99 kg)	RS Fr	West Charlotte HS	Charlotte, NC
G	5	Jaden Shackelford	6 ft 3 in (1.91 m)	200 lb (91 kg)	So	Hesperia HS	Hesperia, CA
G	10	Delaney Heard (W)	6 ft 3 in (1.91 m)	198 lb (90 kg)	Fr	Oak Hill Academy	Canton, GA
G	11	Joshua Primo	6 ft 6 in (1.98 m)	190 lb (86 kg)	Fr	Royal Crown	Toronto, ON
F	12	Darius Miles	6 ft 6 in (1.98 m)	185 lb (84 kg)	Fr	Theodore Roosevelt HS	Washington, D.C.
G	13	Jahvon Quinerly	6 ft 1 in (1.85 m)	175 lb (79 kg)	RS So	Villanova	Hackensack, NJ
G	14	Keon Ellis	6 ft 6 in (1.98 m)	170 lb (77 kg)	Jr	Florida SouthWestern State	Eustis, FL
F	15	Tyler Barnes (W)	6 ft 8 in (2.03 m)	201 lb (91 kg)	Sr	St. Xavier HS	Louisville, KY
G	21	Britton Johnson (W)	6 ft 4 in (1.93 m)	183 lb (83 kg)	Jr	Mountain Brook HS	Mountain Brook, AL
F	22	Keon Ambrose-Hylton	6 ft 8 in (2.03 m)	210 lb (95 kg)	Fr	Andrews Osborne Academy	Toronto, ON
G	23	John Petty Jr.	6 ft 5 in (1.96 m)	184 lb (83 kg)	Sr	Jemison HS	Huntsville, AL
G	24	Jaden Quinerly (W)	6 ft 0 in (1.83 m)	155 lb (70 kg)	Fr	Ramsey HS	Hackensack, NJ
G	25	Adam Cottrell (W)	6 ft 3 in (1.91 m)	200 lb (91 kg)	So	Lakeview Academy	Flowery Branch, GA
F	30	Kendall Wall (W)	6 ft 5 in (1.96 m)	192 lb (87 kg)	GS	Francis Marion University	Columbia, SC
F	33	James Rojas	6 ft 8 in (2.03 m)	220 lb (100 kg)	RS Jr	Hutchinson CC	Jamestown, NY
F	35	Alex Tchikou (injured)	6 ft 11 in (2.11 m)	225 lb (102 kg)	Fr	Dream City Christian HS	Paris, France

Head coach

- Nate Oats (Maranatha Baptist)

Assistant coach(es)

- Bryan Hodgson (Fredonia State)
- Antoine Pettway (Alabama)
- Charlie Henry (Madonna)

Legend

- (C) Team captain
- (S) Suspended
- (I) Ineligible
- (W) Walk-on
- Injured
- Current redshirt

Roster

== Schedule and results ==
Date time, TV	Rank^{#}	Opponent^{#}	Result	Record	High points	High rebounds	High assists	Site (attendance) city, state
Non-conference regular season
November 25, 2020*; 7:00 pm, SECN		Jacksonville State	W 81–57	1–0	18 – Tied	12 – Jones	3 – Quinerly	Coleman Coliseum (2,025); Tuscaloosa, AL
November 30, 2020*; 8:30 pm, ESPN2		vs. Stanford; Maui Invitational Quarterfinals	L 64–82	1–1	14 – Quinerly	6 – Petty	3 – Primo	Harrah's Cherokee Center (0); Asheville, NC
December 1, 2020*; 8:30 pm, ESPN2		vs. UNLV; Maui Invitational consolation 2nd round	W 86–74	2–1	22 – Petty Jr.	7 – Bruner	6 – Petty Jr	Harrah's Cherokee Center (0); Asheville, NC
December 2, 2020*; 6:00 pm, ESPN2		vs. Providence; Maui Invitational 5th Place Game	W 88–71	3–1	16 – Petty Jr.	8 – Jones	5 – Jones	Harrah's Cherokee Center (0); Asheville, NC
December 12, 2020*; 7:00 pm, ACCNX		vs. Clemson; Holiday Hoopsgiving	L 56–64	3–2	17 – Jones	5 – Reese	5 – Reese	State Farm Arena (0); Atlanta, GA
December 15, 2020*; 8:00 pm, SECN		Furman	W 83–80	4–2	18 – Jones	12 – Jones	5 – Petty Jr.	Coleman Coliseum (2,055); Tuscaloosa, AL
December 19, 2020*; 1:00 pm, ESPNU		Western Kentucky	L 71–73	4–3	16 – Jones	7 – Petty, Jr.	3 – Tied	Coleman Coliseum (2,055); Tuscaloosa, AL
December 22, 2020*; 6:30 pm, SECN+		ETSU	W 85–69	5–3	26 – Shackelford	8 – Bruner	9 – Quinerly	Coleman Coliseum (2,055); Tuscaloosa, AL
SEC regular season
December 29, 2020; 8:00 pm, SECN		Ole Miss	W 82–64	6–3 (1–0)	24 – Quinerly	7 – Shackelford	4 – Shackelford	Coleman Coliseum (2,055); Tuscaloosa, AL
January 2, 2021; 5:00 pm, ESPN2		at No. 7 Tennessee	W 71–63	7–3 (2–0)	19 – Petty Jr.	8 – Jones	6 – Quinerly	Thompson–Boling Arena (4,191); Knoxville, TN
January 5, 2021; 6:00 pm, ESPNU		Florida	W 86–71	8–3 (3–0)	16 – Tied	8 – Ellis	4 – Bruner	Coleman Coliseum (2,055); Tuscaloosa, AL
January 9, 2021; 11:00 am, ESPN2		at Auburn; Iron Bowl of Basketball	W 94–90	9–3 (4–0)	22 – Primo	8 – Tied	4 – Bruner	Auburn Arena (1,824); Auburn, AL
January 12, 2021; 8:00 pm, ESPN		at Kentucky	W 85–65	10–3 (5–0)	23 – Petty Jr.	6 – Rojas	6 – Shackelford	Rupp Arena (3,075); Lexington, KY
January 16, 2021; 2:30 pm, SECN		Arkansas	W 90–59	11–3 (6–0)	17 – Petty Jr.	5 – Primo	4 – Quinerly	Coleman Coliseum (2,055); Tuscaloosa, AL
January 19, 2021; 8:00 pm, ESPN2	No. 18	at LSU	W 105–75	12–3 (7–0)	24 – Petty Jr.	7 – Rojas	8 – Shackelford	Pete Maravich Assembly Center (2,295); Baton Rouge, LA
January 23, 2021; 5:00 pm, SECN	No. 18	Mississippi State	W 81–73	13–3 (8–0)	17 – Jones	5 – Jones	7 – Jones	Coleman Coliseum (2,055); Tuscaloosa, AL
January 26, 2021; 6:00 pm, ESPN	No. 9	Kentucky	W 70–59	14–3 (9–0)	21 – Shackelford	9 – Jones	8 – Jones	Coleman Coliseum (2,055); Tuscaloosa, AL
January 30, 2021*; 11:00 a.m., ESPN	No. 9	at No. 24 Oklahoma; Big 12/SEC Challenge	L 61–66	14–4	15 – Reese	7 – Jones	5 – Jones	Lloyd Noble Center (2,680); Norman, OK
February 3, 2021; 6:00 pm, ESPNU	No. 10	LSU	W 78–60	15–4 (10–0)	19 – Shackelford	8 – Jones	5 – Petty Jr.	Coleman Coliseum (2,055); Tuscaloosa, AL
February 6, 2021; 11:00 am, ESPN	No. 10	at No. 18 Missouri	L 65–68	15–5 (10–1)	15 – Shackleford	6 – Tied	1 – Tied	Mizzou Arena (3,113); Columbia, MO
February 9, 2021; 5:30 pm, SECN	No. 11	at South Carolina	W 81–78	16–5 (11–1)	20 – Petty Jr.	8 – Petty Jr.	7 – Jones	Colonial Life Arena (3,089); Columbia, SC
February 13, 2021; 2:30 pm, SECN	No. 11	Georgia	W 115–82	17–5 (12–1)	21 – Jones	5 – Tied	4 – Tied	Coleman Coliseum (2,055); Tuscaloosa, AL
February 18, 2021; 2:00 pm, SECN	No. 8	at Texas A&M	Postponed due to inclement weather					Reed Arena; College Station, TX
February 20, 2021; 12:00 pm, SECN	No. 8	Vanderbilt	W 82–78	18–5 (13–1)	27 – Shackelford	9 – Ellis	4 – Jones	Coleman Coliseum (2,055); Tuscaloosa, AL
February 24, 2021; 8:00 pm, ESPN2	No. 6	at No. 20 Arkansas	L 66–81	18–6 (13–2)	14 – Bruner	9 – Gary	4 – Tied	Bud Walton Arena (4,400); Fayetteville, AR
February 27, 2021; 5:00 pm, SECN	No. 6	at Mississippi State	W 64–59	19–6 (14–2)	19 – Quinerly	14 – Jones	2 – Tied	Humphrey Coliseum (1,000); Starkville, MS
March 2, 2021; 6:00 pm, ESPN2	No. 8	Auburn; Iron Bowl of Basketball	W 70–58	20–6 (15–2)	23 – Shackelford	9 – Jones	6 – Jones	Coleman Coliseum (2,055); Tuscaloosa, AL
March 6, 2021; 1:00 pm, CBS	No. 8	at Georgia	W 89–79	21–6 (16–2)	18 – Quinerly	7 – Petty Jr.	4 – Tied	Stegeman Coliseum (1,638); Athens, GA
SEC Tournament
March 12, 2021; 11:00 am, ESPN	(1) No. 6	vs. (9) Mississippi State; Quarterfinals	W 85–48	22–6	14 – Quinerly	7 – Tied	7 – Jones	Bridgestone Arena (2,186); Nashville, TN
March 13, 2021; 12:00 pm, ESPN	(1) No. 6	vs. (4) Tennessee; Semifinals	W 73–68	23–6	21 – Jones	13 – Jones	4 – Jones	Bridgestone Arena (3,164); Nashville, TN
March 14, 2021; 12:00 pm, ESPN	(1) No. 6	vs. (3) LSU; Championship	W 80–79	24–6	21 – Shackelford	11 – Jones	6 – Jones	Bridgestone Arena (2,586); Nashville, TN
NCAA tournament
March 20, 2021; 3:00 pm, TBS	(2 E) No. 5	vs. (15 E) Iona; First Round	W 68–55	25–6	20 – Jones	7 – Petty Jr.	3 – Ellis	Hinkle Fieldhouse (1,037); Indianapolis, IN
March 22, 2021; 7:45 pm, TNT	(2 E) No. 5	vs. (10 E) Maryland; Second Round	W 96–77	26–6	21 – Shackelford	7 – Gary	11 – Quinerly	Bankers Life Fieldhouse (2,226); Indianapolis, IN
March 28, 2021; 6:15 pm, TBS	(2 E) No. 5	vs. (11 E) UCLA; Sweet Sixteen	L 78–88 ^{OT}	26–7	20 – Quinerly	9 – Tied	3 – Tied	Hinkle Fieldhouse (1,055); Indianapolis, IN
*Non-conference game. ^{#}Rankings from AP Poll. (#) Tournament seedings in parentheses. All times are in Central Time.

== Rankings ==
Ranking movements Legend: ██ Increase in ranking ██ Decrease in ranking — = Not ranked RV = Received votes т = Tied with team above or below
	Week																	
Poll	Pre	1	2	3	4	5	6	7	8	9	10	11	12	13	14	15	16	Final
AP	RV	RV	RV	—	—	—	RV	RV	18	9	10	11	8	6	8	6	5	Not released
Coaches	25	25^	RV	—	—	—	RV	24т	16	8т	7	11	9	7	5т	5	5	5

*AP does not release post-NCAA Tournament rankings
^Coaches did not release a Week 1 poll.
