= 2020–21 VMI Keydets basketball team =

American college basketball season

2020–21 VMI Keydets basketball
- Conference: Southern Conference
- Record: 13–12 (7–7 SoCon)
- Head coach: Dan Earl (6th season)
- Assistant coaches: Austin Kenon (4th season); Ander Galfsky (2nd season); Logan Dahms (2nd season)
- Home arena: Cameron Hall

2020–21 Southern Conference men's basketball standings
	Conf.				Overall
Team	W		L	PCT	W		L	PCT
UNC Greensboro †	13	–	5	.722	21	–	9	.700
Wofford	12	–	5	.706	15	–	9	.625
Furman	10	–	5	.667	16	–	9	.640
Chattanooga	9	–	7	.563	18	–	8	.692
East Tennessee State	8	–	7	.533	13	–	12	.520
VMI	7	–	7	.500	13	–	12	.520
Mercer	8	–	9	.471	18	–	11	.621
The Citadel	5	–	11	.313	13	–	12	.520
Western Carolina	4	–	13	.235	11	–	16	.407
Samford	2	–	9	.182	6	–	13	.316
† 2021 SoCon tournament winner

The 2020–21 VMI Keydets basketball team represented the Virginia Military Institute during the 2020–21 NCAA Division I men's basketball season. The Keydets were led by sixth-year head coach Dan Earl and played their home games in Cameron Hall in Lexington, Virginia, their home since 1981, as members of the Southern Conference.

== Previous season ==
The Keydets finished the 2019–20 campaign with a record of 9–24, 3–15 in SoCon play to finish in ninth place. They defeated Samford in the first round of the SoCon tournament before losing to East Tennessee State in the quarterfinals.

== Roster ==
2020–21 VMI Keydets men's basketball team
Players
Coaches

Pos.	#	Name	Height	Weight	Year	Hometown
G	0	Louis Tang	6 ft 4 in (1.93 m)	195 lb (88 kg)	So	Kaohsiung, Taiwan
F	1	Tragen Fahl	6 ft 8 in (2.03 m)	195 lb (88 kg)	Jr	Virginia Beach, Virginia
G	2	Trey Bonham	6 ft 0 in (1.83 m)	170 lb (77 kg)	Fr	Mobile, Alabama
G	5	Greg Parham	6 ft 4 in (1.93 m)	176 lb (80 kg)	Sr	Richmond, Virginia
G	10	Kamdyn Curfman	6 ft 1 in (1.85 m)	186 lb (84 kg)	So	North Bethesda, Maryland
G	11	Devin Butler	6 ft 2 in (1.88 m)	195 lb (88 kg)	Fr	Ridgeland, South Carolina
G	12	Ta'Vonne Bond	6 ft 0 in (1.83 m)	177 lb (80 kg)	Sr	Columbia, South Carolina
F	14	Sam Wolfe	6 ft 8 in (2.03 m)	214 lb (97 kg)	So	Charlotte, North Carolina
G	15	Myles Lewis	6 ft 5 in (1.96 m)	186 lb (84 kg)	Sr	Ashburn, Virginia
F	21	Connor Arnold	6 ft 7 in (2.01 m)	206 lb (93 kg)	Jr	Knoxville, Tennessee
G	24	Tanner Mans	6 ft 6 in (1.98 m)	187 lb (85 kg)	Fr	Wichita, Kansas
G	30	Sean Conway	6 ft 5 in (1.96 m)	215 lb (98 kg)	So	Fairfield, Connecticut
F	32	Caleb Moss	6 ft 7 in (2.01 m)	200 lb (91 kg)	Fr	Dillwyn, Virginia
C	34	Jake Stephens	6 ft 10 in (2.08 m)	266 lb (121 kg)	Jr	Bunker Hill, West Virginia
C	42	DJ Nussbaum	6 ft 9 in (2.06 m)	230 lb (104 kg)	Fr	Houston, Texas

Head coach

- Dan Earl (Penn State '97)

Assistant coach(es)

- Austin Kenon (VMI '11)
- Ander Galfsky (Birmingham–Southern '15)
- Logan Dahms (Texas A&M '13)

Legend

- (C) Team captain
- (S) Suspended
- (I) Ineligible
- (W) Walk-on
- Injured
- Current redshirt

Roster
Last update: December 10, 2020

== Schedule and results ==
Date time, TV	Rank^{#}	Opponent^{#}	Result	Record	Site (attendance) city, state
Non-conference regular season
November 25, 2020*; 7:00 pm, ESPN+		St. Andrews	W 90–63	1–0	Cameron Hall (227); Lexington, VA
November 28, 2020*; 1:00 pm, BTN+		at Penn State	L 65–86	1–1	Bryce Jordan Center (248); University Park, PA
December 1, 2020*; 5:00 pm, ESPN+		Longwood	W 84–71	2–1	Cameron Hall (200); Lexington, VA
December 3, 2020*; 8:00 pm, ACCN		at No. 16 Virginia Tech	L 57–64	2–2	Cassell Coliseum (250); Blacksburg, VA
December 8, 2020*; 7:00 pm, ESPN+		Greensboro College	W 100–65	3–2	Cameron Hall (200); Lexington, VA
December 13, 2020*; 1:00 pm, ESPN+		Hampton	W 79–64	4–2	Cameron Hall (228); Lexington, VA
December 15, 2020*; 7:00 pm, ESPN+		Campbellsville–Harrodsburg	W 106–72	5–2	Cameron Hall (175); Lexington, VA
December 18, 2020*; 12:00 pm, ESPN+		at Gardner–Webb	L 77–88	5–3	Paul Porter Arena (0); Boiling Springs, NC
December 21, 2020*; 1:00 pm, ESPN+		at George Mason	L 66–68	5–4	EagleBank Arena (197); Fairfax, VA
SoCon regular season
December 30, 2020; 8:00 pm, ESPN+		at Samford	L 71–84	5–5 (0–1)	Pete Hanna Center (451); Homewood, AL
January 2, 2021; 1:00 pm, ESPN+		Chattanooga	W 84–79	6–5 (1–1)	Cameron Hall (150); Lexington, VA
January 9, 2021; ESPN+		at Furman	Postponed		Timmons Arena; Greenville, SC
January 13, 2021; 7:00 pm, ESPN+		Wofford	L 78–80	6–6 (1–2)	Cameron Hall (203); Lexington, VA
January 16, 2021; 1:00 pm, ESPN+		The Citadel	W 110–103	7–6 (2–2)	Cameron Hall (250); Lexington, VA
January 18, 2021; 7:00 pm, ESPN+		at East Tennessee State	L 81–92	7–7 (2–3)	Freedom Hall Civic Center (720); Johnson City, TN
January 20, 2021; 7:00 pm, ESPN+		Furman	W 74–73	8–7 (3–3)	Cameron Hall (210); Lexington, VA
January 23, 2021; 2:00 pm, ESPN+		at Mercer	L 80–83	8–8 (3–4)	Hawkins Arena (927); Macon, GA
January 27, 2021; 7:00 pm, ESPN+		Western Carolina	W 87–61	9–8 (4–4)	Cameron Hall (225); Lexington, VA
January 30, 2021; 7:00 pm, ESPN+		at UNC Greensboro	L 59–79	9–9 (4–5)	Greensboro Coliseum (100); Greensboro, NC
February 3, 2021; 7:00 pm, ESPN+		at Wofford	W 84–80 ^{OT}	10–9 (5–5)	Jerry Richardson Indoor Stadium; Spartanburg, SC
February 10, 2021; 7:00 pm, ESPN+		at Western Carolina	L 72–74	10–10 (5–6)	Ramsey Center; Cullowhee, NC
February 13, 2021; 1:00 pm, ESPN+		Samford	W 85–56	11–10 (6–6)	Cameron Hall; Lexington, VA
February 17, 2021; 7:00 pm, ESPN+		UNC Greensboro	W 88–77	12–10 (7–6)	Cameron Hall; Lexington, VA
February 20, 2021; 1:00 pm, ESPN+		at The Citadel	L 74–75	12–11 (7–7)	McAlister Field House (1,062); Charleston, SC
February 22, 2021; 7:00 pm, ESPN+		Furman	Cancelled		Timmons Arena; Greenville, SC
February 24, 2021; 7:00 pm, ESPN+		East Tennessee State	Cancelled		Cameron Hall; Lexington, VA
February 27, 2021; 7:00 pm, ESPN+		at Chattanooga	Cancelled		McAlister Field House; Charleston, SC
SoCon tournament
March 6, 2021; 8:00 pm, ESPN+	(6)	vs. (3) Furman; Quarterfinals	W 91–90 ^{OT}	13–11	Harrah's Cherokee Center (512); Asheville, NC
March 7, 2021; 7:30 pm, ESPNU	(6)	vs. (7) Mercer; Semifinals	L 59–73	13–12	Harrah's Cherokee Center (516); Asheville, NC
*Non-conference game. ^{#}Rankings from AP Poll. (#) Tournament seedings in parentheses. All times are in Eastern.

== Post Season Awards ==
- Greg Parham (2nd Team All SoCon)
- Jake Stephens (3rd Team All SoCon)
- Jake Stephens (2nd Team All SoCon Tournament)
- Myles Lewis (2nd Team All SoCon Tournament)
- Trey Bonham (1st Team All SoCon Freshman)
- Dan Earl (SoCon Coach of the Year)
