= 2021 Southern Conference men's basketball tournament =

- Classification: Division I
- Season: 2020–21
- Teams: 10
- Site: Harrah's Cherokee Center; Asheville, North Carolina
- Champions: UNC Greensboro (3rd title)
- Winning coach: Wes Miller (2nd title)
- MVP: Isaiah Miller (UNC Greensboro)
- Television: ESPN+, ESPNU, ESPN

2020–21 Southern Conference men's basketball standings
	Conf.				Overall
Team	W		L	PCT	W		L	PCT
UNC Greensboro †	13	–	5	.722	21	–	9	.700
Wofford	12	–	5	.706	15	–	9	.625
Furman	10	–	5	.667	16	–	9	.640
Chattanooga	9	–	7	.563	18	–	8	.692
East Tennessee State	8	–	7	.533	13	–	12	.520
VMI	7	–	7	.500	13	–	12	.520
Mercer	8	–	9	.471	18	–	11	.621
The Citadel	5	–	11	.313	13	–	12	.520
Western Carolina	4	–	13	.235	11	–	16	.407
Samford	2	–	9	.182	6	–	13	.316
† 2021 SoCon tournament winner

The 2021 Southern Conference men's basketball tournament was the postseason men's basketball tournament for the Southern Conference for the 2020–21 season. All tournament games were played at the Harrah's Cherokee Center in Asheville, North Carolina, from March 5 through 8, 2021. The winner of the tournament received the conference's automatic bid to the 2021 NCAA Division I men's basketball tournament.

== Seeds ==
All ten teams in the Southern Conference were eligible to compete in the conference tournament. Teams were seeded by record within the conference, with a tiebreaker system to seed teams with identical conference records. The top six teams received first-round byes.

Seed	School	Conference
1	UNC Greensboro	13–5
2	Wofford	12–5
3	Furman	10–5
4	Chattanooga	9–7
5	ETSU	8–7
6	VMI	7–7
7	Mercer	8–9
8	The Citadel	5–11
9	Western Carolina	4–13
10	Samford	2–9

== Schedule and results ==
Game	Time	Matchup	Score	Television
First round – Friday, March 5
1	5:30 pm	No. 8 The Citadel vs. No. 9 Western Carolina	100–86	ESPN+
2	8:00 pm	No. 7 Mercer vs No. 10 Samford	87–59	ESPN+
Quarterfinals – Saturday, March 6
3	12:00 pm	No. 1 UNC Greensboro vs. No. 8 The Citadel	80–72	ESPN+
4	2:30 pm	No. 4 Chattanooga vs. No. 5 ETSU	53–63	ESPN+
5	5:30 pm	No. 2 Wofford vs. No. 7 Mercer	61–62	ESPN+
6	8:00 pm	No. 3 Furman vs. No. 6 VMI	90–91^{OT}	ESPN+
Semifinals – Sunday, March 7
7	5:00 pm	No. 1 UNC Greensboro vs. No. 5 ETSU	77–65	ESPNU
8	7:30 pm	No. 7 Mercer vs. No. 6 VMI	73–59	ESPNU
Final – Monday, March 8
9	7:00 pm	No. 1 UNC Greensboro vs. No. 7 Mercer	69–61	ESPN
*Game times in EST. Rankings denote tournament seed

== Bracket ==
First round March 5 ESPN+
8	The Citadel	100
9	Western Carolina	86
7	Mercer	87
10	Samford	59

Quarterfinals; March 6 ESPN+
1	UNC Greensboro	80
8	The Citadel	72
4	Chattanooga	53
5	East Tennessee State	63
2	Wofford	61
7	Mercer	62
3	Furman	90
6	VMI	91*

Semifinals; March 7 ESPNU
1	UNC Greensboro	77
5	East Tennessee State	65
7	Mercer	73
6	VMI	59

Championship; March 8 ESPN
1	UNC Greensboro	69
7	Mercer	61

== See also ==
- 2021 Southern Conference women's basketball tournament
