= 2020–21 Wofford Terriers men's basketball team =

American college basketball season

2020–21 Wofford Terriers men's basketball
- Conference: Southern Conference
- Record: 15–9 (12–5 SoCon)
- Head coach: Jay McAuley (2nd season)
- Assistant coaches: Dwight Perry; Paul Hemrick; Will Murphy
- Home arena: Jerry Richardson Indoor Stadium

2020–21 Southern Conference men's basketball standings
| | Conf. | | | | Overall |
| Team | W | | L | PCT | W | | L | PCT |
|---|---|---|---|---|---|---|---|---|
| UNC Greensboro † | 13 | – | 5 | .722 | 21 | – | 9 | .700 |
| Wofford | 12 | – | 5 | .706 | 15 | – | 9 | .625 |
| Furman | 10 | – | 5 | .667 | 16 | – | 9 | .640 |
| Chattanooga | 9 | – | 7 | .563 | 18 | – | 8 | .692 |
| East Tennessee State | 8 | – | 7 | .533 | 13 | – | 12 | .520 |
| VMI | 7 | – | 7 | .500 | 13 | – | 12 | .520 |
| Mercer | 8 | – | 9 | .471 | 18 | – | 11 | .621 |
| The Citadel | 5 | – | 11 | .313 | 13 | – | 12 | .520 |
| Western Carolina | 4 | – | 13 | .235 | 11 | – | 16 | .407 |
| Samford | 2 | – | 9 | .182 | 6 | – | 13 | .316 |
† 2021 SoCon tournament winner

The 2020–21 Wofford Terriers men's basketball team represented Wofford College during the 2020–21 NCAA Division I men's basketball season. The team was led by second-year head coach Jay McAuley, and played their home games at Jerry Richardson Indoor Stadium in Spartanburg, South Carolina as a member of the Southern Conference (SoCon). They finished the season 15–9 overall, 12–5 in SoCon play, to finish in second place.

== Previous season ==
The Terriers finished the 2019–20 season 19–16 overall, 8–10 in SoCon play, to finish in seventh place. They defeated The Citadel, Furman and Chattanooga to advance to the championship game of the SoCon tournament where they lost to East Tennessee State. All postseason play was canceled due to the ongoing COVID-19 pandemic.

== Roster ==
2020–21 Wofford Terriers men's basketball team
Players
Coaches

| Pos. | # | Name | Height | Weight | Year | Hometown |
|---|---|---|---|---|---|---|
| G | 1 | Keaton Turner | 6 ft 0 in (1.83 m) | 155 lb (70 kg) | Fr | Hopewell, VA |
| G | 2 | Max Klesmit | 6 ft 3 in (1.91 m) | 180 lb (82 kg) | Fr | Neenah, WI |
| G | 4 | Isaiah Bigelow | 6 ft 7 in (2.01 m) | 185 lb (84 kg) | So | Greensboro, NC |
| G | 5 | Storm Murphy | 6 ft 0 in (1.83 m) | 180 lb (82 kg) | Sr | Middleton, WI |
| G | 11 | Ryan Larson | 6 ft 1 in (1.85 m) | 175 lb (79 kg) | Jr | St. Paul, MN |
| F | 12 | Alex Michael | 6 ft 6 in (1.98 m) | 205 lb (93 kg) | Jr | Greensboro, NC |
| G | 13 | Morgan Safford | 6 ft 5 in (1.96 m) | 190 lb (86 kg) | So | Columbus, OH |
| F | 14 | Sam Godwin | 6 ft 9 in (2.06 m) | 210 lb (95 kg) | Fr | Moore, OK |
| G | 15 | Austin Patterson | 6 ft 3 in (1.91 m) | 180 lb (82 kg) | Fr | Sonora, CA |
| C | 20 | David Appelgren | 7 ft 1 in (2.16 m) | 238 lb (108 kg) | Jr | Stockholm, Sweden |
| G | 21 | Tray Hollowell | 6 ft 3 in (1.91 m) | 185 lb (84 kg) | Sr | Hopkinsville, KY |
| G | 22 | Jonathan Steelman | 6 ft 3 in (1.91 m) | 170 lb (77 kg) | So | Aiken, SC |
| F | 23 | Nick Pringle | 6 ft 8 in (2.03 m) | 200 lb (91 kg) | Fr | Seabrook, SC |
| G | 24 | Jackson Gore | 6 ft 3 in (1.91 m) | 180 lb (82 kg) | Fr | Blacksburg, SC |
| F | 25 | Messiah Jones | 6 ft 6 in (1.98 m) | 215 lb (98 kg) | So | Chicago, IL |
| F/C | 33 | B.J. Mack | 6 ft 8 in (2.03 m) | 250 lb (113 kg) | So | Charlotte, NC |

Head coach

- Jay McAuley (Georgia)

Assistant coach(es)

- Dwight Perry (Kentucky)
- Paul Hemrick (Georgia)
- Will Murphy (Wake Forest)

Legend

- (C) Team captain
- (S) Suspended
- (I) Ineligible
- (W) Walk-on
- Injured
- Current redshirt

Roster
Last update: December 16, 2020

== Schedule and results ==
| Date time, TV | Rank^{#} | Opponent^{#} | Result | Record | High points | High rebounds | High assists | Site (attendance) city, state |
Non-conference regular season
| November 25, 2020*; 6:00 p.m., ESPN+ | | Toccoa Falls | W 88–49 | 1–0 | 19 – tied | 12 – Jones | 3 – tied | Jerry Richardson Indoor Stadium; Spartanburg, SC |
| November 28, 2020*; 2:00 p.m., ESPN+ | | Carver | W 111–37 | 2–0 | 17 – Pringle | 11 – Pringle | 6 – Safford | Jerry Richardson Indoor Stadium; Spartanburg, SC |
| December 3, 2020*; 6:00 p.m. | | North Carolina Central | Canceled due to COVID-19 issues | | | | | Jerry Richardson Indoor Stadium; Spartanburg, SC |
| December 6, 2020*; 2:00 p.m. | | at Presbyterian | Canceled due to COVID-19 issues | | | | | Templeton Physical Education Center; Clinton, SC |
| December 7, 2020*; 2:00 pm, ESPN+ | | at No. 19 Richmond | L 72–77 | 2–1 | 21 – Murphy | 10 – Jones | 5 – Hollowell | Robins Center; Richmond, VA |
| December 13, 2020*; 12:00 pm, ESPNews | | vs. South Florida; Holiday Hoopsgiving | L 56–58 | 2–2 | 21 – Hollowell | 8 – Murphy | 6 – Murphy | State Farm Arena; Atlanta, GA |
| December 15, 2020*; 6:00 p.m., ESPN+ | | Coastal Carolina | W 88–77 | 3–2 | 26 – Murphy | 7 – tied | 7 – Murphy | Jerry Richardson Indoor Stadium; Spartanburg, SC |
| December 21, 2020*; 1:00 p.m., SECN | | at Texas A&M | L 52–70 | 3–3 | 14 – Klesmit | 6 – Jones | 8 – Larson | Reed Arena (613); College Station, TX |
Southern Conference regular season
| December 29, 2020; 7:00 p.m., ESPNU | | at Mercer | W 78–65 | 4–3 (1–0) | 16 – Murphy | 9 – Larson | 4 – tied | Hawkins Arena (946); Macon, GA |
| January 2, 2021; 7:00 p.m., ESPN+ | | Samford | W 94–84 | 5–3 (2–0) | 23 – Murphy | 6 – tied | 11 – Murphy | Jerry Richardson Indoor Stadium; Spartanburg, SC |
| January 6, 2021; 7:00 p.m., ESPN+ | | UNC Greensboro | L 75–84 | 5–4 (2–1) | 25 – Murphy | 7 – Jones | 4 – Murphy | Jerry Richardson Indoor Stadium; Spartanburg, SC |
| January 9, 2021; 5:00 p.m., ESPN+ | | at UNC Greensboro | W 48–45 | 6–4 (3–1) | 18 – Murphy | 9 – Godwin | 3 – Larson | Greensboro Coliseum (60); Greensboro, NC |
| January 13, 2021; 7:00 p.m., ESPN+ | | at VMI | W 80–78 | 7–4 (4–1) | 23 – Murphy | 9 – Hollowell | 4 – Murphy | Cameron Hall (203); Lexington, VA |
| January 16, 2021; 2:00 p.m., ESPN+ | | at Chattanooga | W 77–59 | 8–4 (5–1) | 23 – Murphy | 8 – Larson | 5 – Murphy | McKenzie Arena; Chattanooga, TN |
| January 23, 2021; 4:00 p.m., ESPN+ | | Western Carolina | W 91–78 | 9–4 (6–1) | 28 – Murphy | 5 – Safford | 4 – Murphy | Jerry Richardson Indoor Stadium; Spartanburg, SC |
| January 27, 2021; 7:00 p.m., ESPN+ | | at The Citadel | L 69–77 | 9–5 (6–2) | 16 – Murphy | 7 – Klesmit | 3 – Larson | McAlister Field House; Charleston, SC |
| January 30, 2021; 7:00 p.m., ESPN+ | | Mercer | W 72–69 | 10–5 (7–2) | 22 – Hollowell | 6 – Jones | 2 – 3 tied | Jerry Richardson Indoor Stadium; Spartanburg, SC |
| February 1, 2021; 7:00 p.m., ESPN+ | | East Tennessee State | W 67–62 | 11–5 (8–2) | 19 – Murphy | 6 – Klesmit | 3 – Larson | Jerry Richardson Indoor Stadium; Spartanburg, SC |
| February 3, 2021; 7:00 p.m., ESPN+ | | VMI | L 80–84 ^{OT} | 11–6 (8–3) | 14 – Larson | 5 – Larson | 7 – Murphy | Jerry Richardson Indoor Stadium; Spartanburg, SC |
| February 6, 2021; 4:00 p.m., ESPN+ | | at Furman | W 75–67 | 12–6 (9–3) | 24 – Murphy | 6 – Safford | 6 – Murphy | Bon Secours Wellness Arena; Greenville, SC |
| February 10, 2021; 7:00 p.m., ESPN+ | | Chattanooga | L 66–78 | 12–7 (9–4) | 18 – Safford | 5 – Klesmit | 2 – Klesmit | Jerry Richardson Indoor Stadium; Spartanburg, SC |
| February 13, 2021; 4:00 p.m., ESPN+ | | at East Tennessee State | L 49–71 | 12–8 (9–5) | 11 – Murphy | 6 – tied | 5 – Murphy | Freedom Hall Civic Center; Johnson City, TN |
| February 17, 2021; 7:00 p.m., ESPN+ | | The Citadel | W 81–67 | 13–8 (10–5) | 26 – Murphy | 7 – Jones | 9 – Murphy | Jerry Richardson Indoor Stadium; Spartanburg, SC |
| February 20, 2021; 1:00 p.m., ESPN+ | | at Western Carolina | W 80-56 | 14–8 (11–5) | 14 – Safford | 7 – Larson | 8 – Larson | Ramsey Center; Cullowhee, NC |
| February 22, 2021; 7:00 p.m. | | at Samford | Cancelled due to COVID-19 issues | | | | | Pete Hanna Center; Birmingham, AL |
| February 27, 2021; 7:00 p.m., ESPN+ | | Furman | W 74–73 | 15–8 (12–5) | 19 – Jones | 7 – Jones | 4 – Murphy | Jerry Richardson Indoor Stadium; Spartanburg, SC |
SoCon tournament
| March 6, 2021; 5:30 pm, ESPN+ | (2) | vs. (7) Mercer; Quarterfinals | L 61–62 | 15–9 | 21 – Murphy | 5 – Murphy | 4 – Larson | Harrah's Cherokee Center; Asheville, NC |
*Non-conference game. ^{#}Rankings from AP poll. (#) Tournament seedings in parentheses. All times are in Eastern.
