= Storm Murphy =

American basketball player (born 1999)

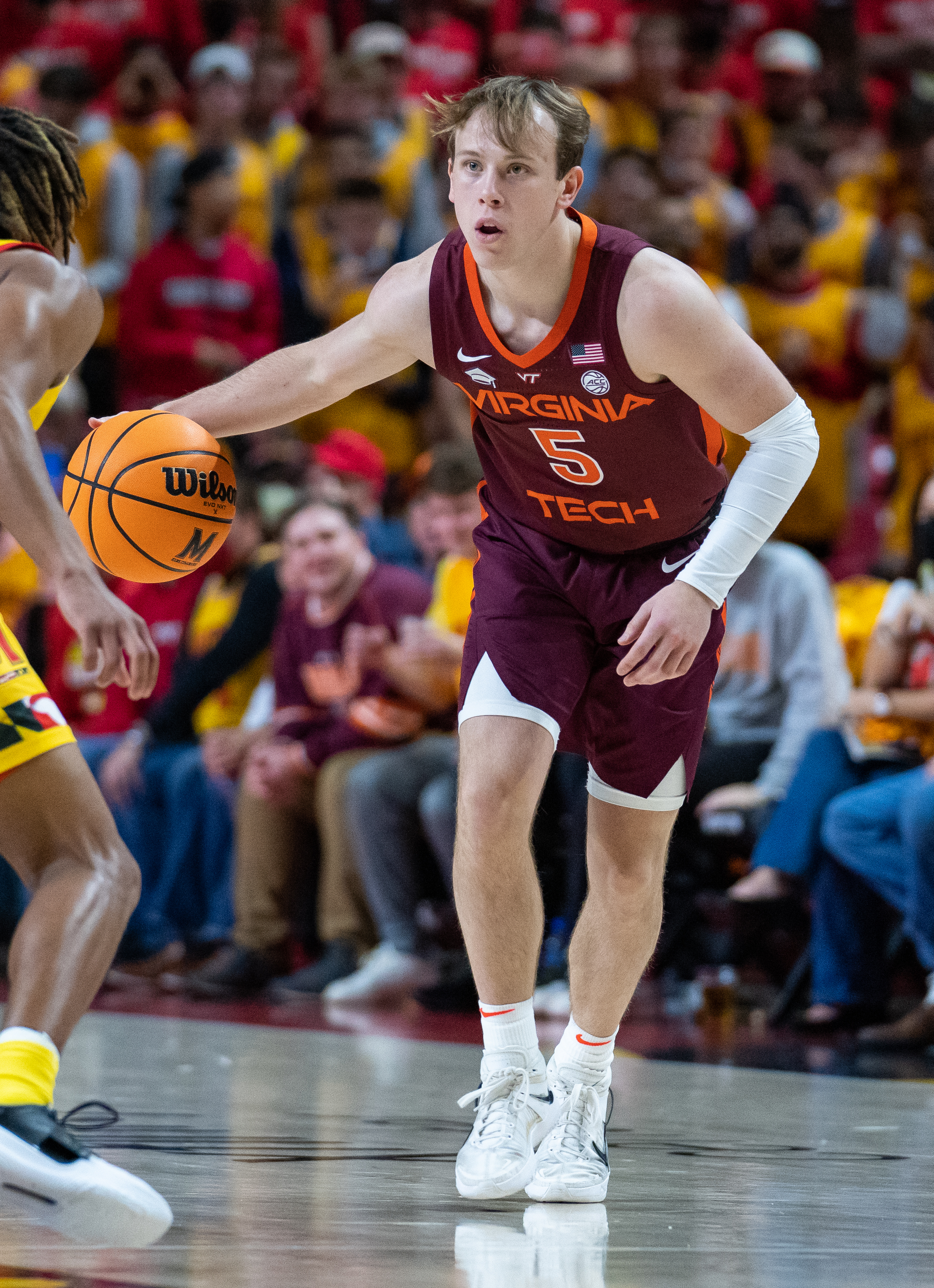
- Murphy playing for Virginia Tech in 2021

No. 5 – Medipolis SC Jena
- Position: Point guard
- League: ProA

Personal information
- Born: January 3, 1999 (age 27) Madison, Wisconsin, U.S.
- Listed height: 5 ft 11 in (1.80 m)
- Listed weight: 185 lb (84 kg)

Career information
- High school: Middleton (Middleton, Wisconsin)
- College: Wofford (2017–2021); Virginia Tech (2021– 2022)
- NBA draft: 2022: undrafted
- Playing career: 2022–present

Career history
- 2022–present: Medipolis SC Jena

Career highlights
- First-team All-SoCon (2021); Second-team All-SoCon (2020)

Storm Murphy (born January 3, 1999) is an American professional player for Medipolis SC Jena of the ProA. He played college basketball for the Wofford Terriers and the Virginia Tech Hokies.

== Early life ==
Murphy attended Middleton High School in Middleton, Wisconsin. He joined the Chicago-based Mac Irvin Fire of the Nike EYBL after his junior season and averaged 8.3 points, 2.9 rebounds, and 4.6 assists per game, distinguishing himself among other top prospects. As a senior, Murphy averaged 19.9 points, 4.8 assists and 2 steals per game. He was a First Team All-Big Eight Conference selection during his junior and senior seasons and earned honorable-mention all-state recognition as a senior from the Wisconsin Basketball Coaches Association. Murphy finished his career with 1,094 points and a school-record 280 assists. He committed to Wofford over offers from South Dakota, Southern Utah, Navy and UTEP, among others.

== College career ==
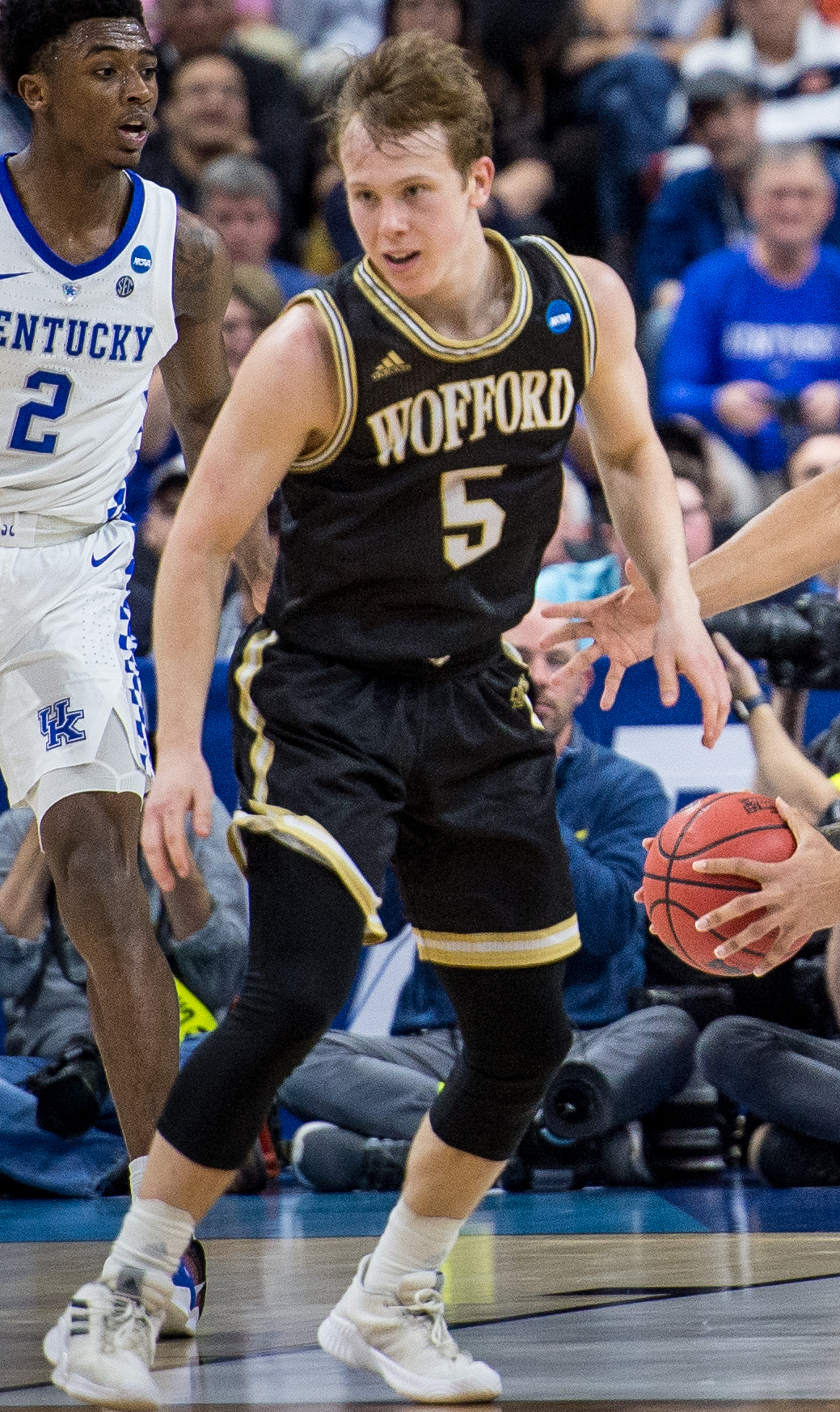
Murphy playing for Wofford in 2019

Murphy averaged 6.3 points, 4 assists and 2.2 rebounds per game as a freshman, starting 28 of 34 games. As a sophomore, he averaged 8 points and 3.3 assists per game on a team that won 30 games and achieved a national ranking. Murphy averaged 11.9 points and 3.5 assists per game as a junior. He was named to the Second Team All-Southern Conference. On January 23, 2021, Murphy scored a career-high 28 points in a 91–78 win against Western Carolina. As a senior, he averaged 17.8 points, 4.3 assists, and 3.3 rebounds per game, shooting 40 percent from three-point range. Murphy was selected to the First Team All-Southern Conference. At Wofford, he was also well respected for his academic prowess, clutch play, and leadership ability. After the Terriers were eliminated from the Southern Conference tournament and his graduation from Wofford, Storm opted to enter the transfer portal for his remaining year of eligibility and received attention from Wisconsin, Baylor, Colorado and Missouri. Murphy ultimately chose to transfer to Virginia Tech, after his previous coach Mike Young reached out to him with interest.

After earning the 7th seed in the 2022 ACC tournament, Murphy and the Hokies won four games in four days on their way to the school's first-ever ACC title, clinching an NCAA tournament bid in the process. Young and Murphy have won conference championships at both Wofford and VT together.

== Professional career ==
On August 23, 2022, Murphy signed with Medipolis SC Jena of the ProA.

== Career statistics ==
Legend
GP	Games played	GS	Games started	MPG	Minutes per game
FG%	Field goal percentage	3P%	3-point field goal percentage	FT%	Free throw percentage
RPG	Rebounds per game	APG	Assists per game	SPG	Steals per game
BPG	Blocks per game	PPG	Points per game	**Bold**	Career high

=== College ===
Year	Team	GP	GS	MPG	FG%	3P%	FT%	RPG	APG	SPG	BPG	PPG
2017–18	Wofford	34	28	27.4	.438	.383	.842	2.2	4.0	.9	.0	6.3
2018–19	Wofford	34	33	26.2	**.500**	**.472**	.844	1.8	3.3	.7	.0	8.0
2019–20	Wofford	34	34	31.4	.464	.424	**.865**	2.6	3.5	.7	.0	11.9
2020–21	Wofford	24	24	**34.4**	.470	.400	.843	**3.3**	**4.3**	**1.0**	.0	**17.8**
2021–22	Virginia Tech	**36**	**36**	26.9	.433	.358	.750	1.9	2.9	0.4	.0	8.0
Career		162	155	28.9	.462	.405	.837	2.3	3.7	0.7	0.0	9.9

== Personal life ==
Murphy graduated from Wofford with a degree in finance. His first name is his mother's maiden name.
