= Sergio Rouco =

Biographical details
- Born: September 6, 1960 (age 66); Cuba
- Education: Nova Southeastern

Coaching career (HC unless noted)
- 1986–1987: Loyola HS
- 1987–1991: FIU (asst.)
- 1991–1995: Miami Norland HS
- 2000–2003: FIU (asst.)
- 2003–2004: UTEP (asst.)
- 2004–2009: FIU
- 2009–2010: Marinos de Anzoátegui
- 2010–2014: Ole Miss (asst.)
- 2014–2017: South Florida (asst.)
- 2017–2020: Austin Peay (asst.)
- 2020–2021: Samford (asst.)

Sergio Rouco is a former basketball coach. He previously served as the head men's basketball coach at Florida International University in Miami, Florida between 2004 and 2009. Rouco most recently served as an assistant coach with the Samford Bulldogs during the 2020–21 season.
