= 2019–20 Western Carolina Catamounts men's basketball team =

American college basketball season

2019–20 Western Carolina Catamounts men's basketball
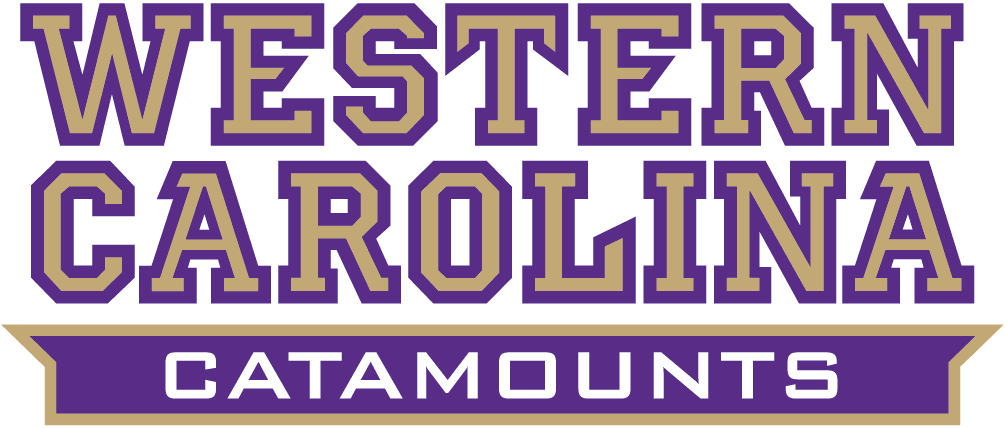
- Conference: Southern Conference
- Record: 19–12 (10–8 SoCon)
- Head coach: Mark Prosser (2nd season)
- Associate head coach: Monty Sanders
- Assistant coaches: Tony Rack; Brigham Waginger
- Home arena: Ramsey Center

2019–20 Southern Conference men's basketball standings
	Conf.				Overall
Team	W		L	PCT	W		L	PCT
East Tennessee State †	16	–	2	.889	30	–	4	.882
Furman	15	–	3	.833	25	–	7	.781
UNC Greensboro	13	–	5	.722	23	–	9	.719
Mercer	11	–	7	.611	17	–	15	.531
Western Carolina	10	–	8	.556	19	–	12	.613
Chattanooga	10	–	8	.556	20	–	13	.606
Wofford	8	–	10	.444	19	–	16	.543
Samford	4	–	14	.222	10	–	23	.303
VMI	3	–	15	.167	9	–	24	.273
The Citadel	0	–	18	.000	6	–	24	.200
† 2020 SoCon tournament winner

The 2019–20 Western Carolina Catamounts men's basketball team represented Western Carolina University in the 2019–20 NCAA Division I men's basketball season. The Catamounts, led by second-year head coach Mark Prosser, played their home games at the Ramsey Center in Cullowhee, North Carolina, as members of the Southern Conference. They finished the season 19–12, 10–8 in Southern Conference play to finish in a tie for fifth place. They defeated Mercer in the quarterfinals of the Southern Conference tournament before losing in the semifinals to East Tennessee State.

== Previous season ==
The Catamounts finished the 2018–19 season 7–25, 4–14 in Southern Conference play to finish in a three-way tie for eighth place. In the Southern Conference tournament, they were defeated by VMI in the first round.

== Offseason ==
=== Player departures ===
Name	Number	Pos.	Height	Weight	Year	Hometown	Reason for departure
Marc Gosselin	12	F	6'7"	205	Senior	Lyon, France	Graduated
Josh Cottrell	15	G	6'2"	185	Freshman	Hayesville, NC	Transferred to North Georgia
Yalim Olclay	35	F	6'8"	225	Junior	İzmir, Turkey	Transferred to Minnesota-Duluth

=== Recruiting Class of 2019 ===
College recruiting information
Name	Hometown	School	Height	Weight	Commit date
Travion McCray; G	Timmonsville, SC	Village Christian Academy	6 ft 1 in (1.85 m)	176 lb (80 kg)	
Travion McCray; G	Recruit ratings: No ratings found				
Tyler Harris; G/F	Charlotte, NC	Independence High School	6 ft 7 in (2.01 m)	186 lb (84 kg)	
Tyler Harris; G/F	Recruit ratings: No ratings found				
Xavier Cork; F	Sulphur Springs, TX	Sulphur Springs High School	6 ft 9 in (2.06 m)	225 lb (102 kg)	
Xavier Cork; F	Recruit ratings: No ratings found				
Ahmir Langlais; F	Atlanta, GA	Holy Spirit Prep	6 ft 7 in (2.01 m)	210 lb (95 kg)	
Ahmir Langlais; F	Recruit ratings: No ratings found				
Overall recruit ranking:
Note: In many cases, Scout, Rivals, 247Sports, On3, and ESPN may conflict in their listings of height and weight.; In these cases, the average was taken. ESPN grades are on a 100-point scale.; Sources:

== Roster ==
2019–20 Western Carolina Catamounts men's basketball team
Players
Coaches

Pos.	#	Name	Height	Weight	Year	Hometown
F	0	Carlos Dotson	6 ft 7 in (2.01 m)	270 lb (122 kg)	Sr	Riverdale, Maryland
G	1	Travion McCray	6 ft 1 in (1.85 m)	176 lb (80 kg)	Fr	Timmonsville, South Carolina
G	2	Matt Halvorsen	6 ft 1 in (1.85 m)	174 lb (79 kg)	Jr	Kingsport, Tennessee
G	3	Jason McMillan	5 ft 11 in (1.8 m)	160 lb (73 kg)	Sr	Cherokee, North Carolina
G/F	4	Tyler Harris	6 ft 7 in (2.01 m)	186 lb (84 kg)	Fr	Charlotte, North Carolina
F	5	D.J. Myers	6 ft 6 in (1.98 m)	200 lb (91 kg)	So	Raleigh, North Carolina
G/F	10	Douglas Elks	6 ft 4 in (1.93 m)	189 lb (86 kg)	RS So	Raleigh, North Carolina
G	11	Mason Faulkner	6 ft 1 in (1.85 m)	181 lb (82 kg)	RS Jr	Glasgow, Kentucky
F	13	Xavier Cork	6 ft 9 in (2.06 m)	225 lb (102 kg)	Fr	Sulphur Springs, Texas
G	14	Kameron Gibson	6 ft 3 in (1.91 m)	186 lb (84 kg)	So	Cincinnati, Ohio
G	21	Marcus Thomas	6 ft 3 in (1.91 m)	180 lb (82 kg)	Jr	Mint Hill, North Carolina
G	23	Malik McCrimmon	5 ft 10 in (1.78 m)	176 lb (80 kg)	Jr	Robbins, North Carolina
F	25	Ahmir Langlais	6 ft 9 in (2.06 m)	210 lb (95 kg)	Fr	Atlanta, Georgia
F	33	Onno Steger	6 ft 5 in (1.96 m)	205 lb (93 kg)	Sr	Upper Arlington, Ohio
F	44	Adam Sledd	6 ft 8 in (2.03 m)	220 lb (100 kg)	Sr	Roanoke, Virginia

Head coach

- Mark Prosser (Marist)

Assistant coach(es)

- Monty Sanders (Elon)
- Tony Rack (Northern Kentucky)
- Brigham Waginger (Western Carolina)

Legend

- (C) Team captain
- (S) Suspended
- (I) Ineligible
- (W) Walk-on
- Injured
- Current redshirt

Roster
Last update: November 28, 2019

== Schedule and results ==
Date time, TV	Rank^{#}	Opponent^{#}	Result	Record	Site (attendance) city, state
Regular season
November 5, 2019*; 7:00 pm, SECN+		at Georgia	L 72–91	0–1	Stegeman Coliseum (8,722); Athens, GA
November 9, 2019*; 12:00 pm, ESPN3		Gardner–Webb	W 71–59	1–1	Ramsey Center (1,735); Cullowhee, NC
November 12, 2019*; 7:00 pm, ESPN+		North Carolina A&T	W 90–64	2–1	Ramsey Center (1,206); Cullowhee, NC
November 15, 2019*; 7:00 pm, FS South		at Florida State	L 74–79	2–2	Donald L. Tucker Center (9,490); Tallahassee, FL
November 21, 2019*; 7:00 pm, ESPN+		at Jacksonville	W 96–94 ^{2OT}	3–2	Swisher Gymnasium (764); Jacksonville, FL
November 24, 2019*; 2:00 pm, ESPN+		at Stetson	W 70–64	4–2	Edmunds Center (522); DeLand, FL
November 27, 2019*; 12:00 pm		Bryan	W 78–54	5–2	Ramsey Center (793); Cullowhee, NC
December 3, 2019; 7:00 pm, ESPN3		Chattanooga	W 87–77	6–2 (1–0)	Ramsey Center (2,021); Cullowhee, NC
December 7, 2019*; 4:00 pm, Nexstar/ESPN+/3		UNC Asheville	W 78–77	7–2	Ramsey Center (2,302); Cullowhee, NC
December 18, 2019*; 6:30 pm, FS1		at Xavier	L 61–74	7–3	Cintas Center (9,907); Cincinnati, OH
December 21, 2019*; 5:00 pm, ESPN+		at Tennessee Tech	W 89–76	8–3	Eblen Center (1,392); Cookeville, TN
December 28, 2019*; 12:00 pm		Piedmont	W 108–47	9–3	Ramsey Center (965); Cullowhee, NC
January 4, 2020; 1:00 pm, ESPN+		at The Citadel	W 86–82	10–3 (2–0)	McAlister Field House (1,056); Charleston, SC
January 8, 2020; 7:00 pm, ESPN3		at VMI	W 97–85	11–3 (3–0)	Cameron Hall (645); Lexington, VA
January 11, 2020; 5:00 pm, ESPN+		Mercer	W 79–71	12–3 (4–0)	Ramsey Center (2,296); Cullowhee, NC
January 15, 2020; 7:00 pm, ESPN+		at Furman	L 79–83	12–4 (4–1)	Timmons Arena (1,695); Greenville, SC
January 18, 2020; 7:00 pm, Nexstar/ESPN+		East Tennessee State	L 66–85	12–5 (4–2)	Ramsey Center (3,756); Cullowhee, NC
January 22, 2020; 7:00 pm, ESPN+		at Mercer	L 79–85	12–6 (4–3)	Hawkins Arena (2,572); Macon, GA
January 25, 2020; 7:00 pm, ESPN3		Wofford	W 81–72	13–6 (5–3)	Ramsey Center (3,809); Cullowhee, NC
January 29, 2020; 7:00 pm, ESPN+		UNC Greensboro	L 58–72	13–7 (5–4)	Ramsey Center (1,860); Cullowhee, NC
February 1, 2020; 2:00 pm, ESPN3		at Chattanooga	W 64–61	14–7 (6–4)	McKenzie Arena (3,188); Chattanooga, TN
February 5, 2020; 7:30 pm, ESPN3		at Samford	W 78–70	15–7 (7–4)	Pete Hanna Center (378); Homewood, AL
February 8, 2020; 2:00 pm, ESPN+		Furman	L 73–82	15–8 (7–5)	Ramsey Center (2,338); Cullowhee, NC
February 12, 2020; 7:00 pm, ESPN+		at UNC Greensboro	L 62–82	15–9 (7–6)	Greensboro Coliseum (3,057); Greensboro, NC
February 15, 2020; 7:00 pm, ESPN+		at Wofford	W 80–74	16–9 (8–6)	Jerry Richardson Indoor Stadium (2,365); Spartanburg, SC
February 19, 2020; 7:00 pm, ESPN+		VMI	L 71–74	16–10 (8–7)	Ramsey Center (1,528); Cullowhee, NC
February 22, 2020; 7:30 pm, ESPN3		The Citadel	W 96–84	17–10 (9–7)	Ramsey Center (3,497); Cullowhee, NC
February 26, 2020; 7:00 pm, ESPN+		Samford	W 109–78	18–10 (10–7)	Ramsey Center (1,474); Cullowhee, NC
February 29, 2020; 4:00 pm, ESPN+		at East Tennessee State	L 67–68	18–11 (10–8)	Freedom Hall Civic Center (6,177); Johnson City, TN
Southern Conference tournament
March 7, 2020; 2:30 pm, ESPN+	(5)	vs. (4) Mercer; Quarterfinals	W 70–56	19–11	Harrah's Cherokee Center (5,573); Asheville, NC
March 8, 2020; 4:00 pm, ESPN+	(5)	vs. (1) East Tennessee State; Semifinals	L 75–97	19–12	Harrah's Cherokee Center (6,132); Asheville, NC
*Non-conference game. ^{#}Rankings from AP Poll. (#) Tournament seedings in parentheses. All times are in Eastern.
