= 2019–20 Mercer Bears men's basketball team =

American college basketball season

2019–20 Mercer Bears men's basketball
- Conference: Southern Conference
- Record: 17–15 (11–7 SoCon)
- Head coach: Greg Gary (1st season)
- Assistant coaches: Bobby Kummer; Kim Lewis; Juan Cardona
- Home arena: Hawkins Arena

2019–20 Southern Conference men's basketball standings
	Conf.				Overall
Team	W		L	PCT	W		L	PCT
East Tennessee State †	16	–	2	.889	30	–	4	.882
Furman	15	–	3	.833	25	–	7	.781
UNC Greensboro	13	–	5	.722	23	–	9	.719
Mercer	11	–	7	.611	17	–	15	.531
Western Carolina	10	–	8	.556	19	–	12	.613
Chattanooga	10	–	8	.556	20	–	13	.606
Wofford	8	–	10	.444	19	–	16	.543
Samford	4	–	14	.222	10	–	23	.303
VMI	3	–	15	.167	9	–	24	.273
The Citadel	0	–	18	.000	6	–	24	.200
† 2020 SoCon tournament winner

The 2019–20 Mercer Bears men's basketball team represented Mercer University in the 2019–20 NCAA Division I men's basketball season. The Bears, led by first-year head coach Greg Gary, played their home games at Hawkins Arena in Macon, Georgia, as members of the Southern Conference. They finished the season 17–15, 11–7 in SoCon play to finish in fourth place. They lost in the quarterfinals of the SoCon tournament to Western Carolina.

== Previous season ==
The Bears finished the 2018–19 season 11–20 overall, 6–12 in SoCon play to finish in a tie for sixth place. In the SoCon tournament, they were defeated by Furman in the first round.

On March 11, 2019, it was announced that head coach Bob Hoffman was fired. On March 26, Purdue assistant Greg Gary was announced as Mercer's next head coach.

== Roster ==
2019–20 Mercer Bears men's basketball team
Players
Coaches

Pos.	#	Name	Height	Weight	Year	Hometown
G	1	Kamar Robertson	6 ft 2 in (1.88 m)	160 lb (73 kg)	Fr	Alpharetta, Georgia
G	2	Neftali Alvarez	6 ft 2 in (1.88 m)	165 lb (75 kg)	So	Cataño, Puerto Rico
G	3	Jeff Gary	6 ft 4 in (1.93 m)	180 lb (82 kg)	RS So	Austin, Texas
G	4	Diego Rivera	6 ft 2 in (1.88 m)	180 lb (82 kg)	Fr	Miami, Florida
G	5	Djordje Dimitrijevic	6 ft 2 in (1.88 m)	180 lb (82 kg)	Sr	Grdelica, Serbia
G	10	Daniel Love	6 ft 3 in (1.91 m)	170 lb (77 kg)	So	Orlando, Florida
G	12	Mitch Prendergast	6 ft 0 in (1.83 m)	190 lb (86 kg)	RS So	Dallas, Texas
F	13	Felipe Haase	6 ft 9 in (2.06 m)	253 lb (115 kg)	Jr	Osorno, Chile
C	14	Victor Bafutto	6 ft 10 in (2.08 m)	230 lb (104 kg)	RS So	Brasília, Brazil
G	20	Ross Cummings	6 ft 3 in (1.91 m)	180 lb (82 kg)	Sr	Dickson, Tennessee
G	22	Ethan Stair	6 ft 4 in (1.93 m)	205 lb (93 kg)	RS Sr	Hazel Green, Alabama
F	23	James Glisson III	6 ft 6 in (1.98 m)	210 lb (95 kg)	Fr	Decatur, Georgia
F	25	Maciej Bender	6 ft 11 in (2.11 m)	255 lb (116 kg)	RS Jr	Warsaw, Poland
F	30	Luke Hamilton	6 ft 8 in (2.03 m)	200 lb (91 kg)	So	Austin, Texas
F	35	Patrick Urey	6 ft 6 in (1.98 m)	210 lb (95 kg)	Fr	Chattanooga, Tennessee

Head coach

- Greg Gary (Tulane)

Assistant coach(es)

- Bobby Kummer (Charlotte)
- Kim Lewis (Tulane)
- Juan Cardona (Middle Georgia State)

Legend

- (C) Team captain
- (S) Suspended
- (I) Ineligible
- (W) Walk-on
- Injured
- Current redshirt

Roster
Last update: November 29, 2019

== Schedule and results ==
Date time, TV	Rank^{#}	Opponent^{#}	Result	Record	Site (attendance) city, state
Exhibition
October 29, 2019*; 7:00 pm		St. Andrews	W 86–55		Hawkins Arena (1,637); Macon, GA
Regular season
November 6, 2019*; 6:30 pm, FS1		at St. John's	L 79–109	0–1	Carnesecca Arena (3,354); Queens, NY
November 8, 2019*; 1:00 pm, ESPN3		Columbia International	W 84–76	1–1	Hawkins Arena (2,027); Macon, GA
November 11, 2019*; 7:00 pm, ESPN+		Kennesaw State	W 74–62	2–1	Hawkins Arena (2,373); Macon, GA
November 15, 2019*; 7:30 pm, ESPN3		Florida Gulf Coast	W 84–68	3–1	Hawkins Arena (2,613); Macon, GA
November 19, 2019*; 7:00 pm, ESPN+		at Georgia Southern	L 88–98	3–2	Hanner Fieldhouse (1,421); Statesboro, GA
November 23, 2019*; 5:00 pm, ESPN+		at UIC; Boca Raton Beach Classic campus-site game	W 72–68	4–2	Credit Union 1 Arena (1,276); Chicago, IL
November 26, 2019*; 7:00 pm, ESPN+		at St. Bonaventure; Boca Raton Beach Classic campus-site game	L 51–56	4–3	Reilly Center (3,218); St. Bonaventure, NY
December 1, 2019*; 12:00 pm, CUSA.tv		vs. Canisius; Boca Raton Beach Classic	L 66–76	4–4	FAU Arena (1,411); Boca Raton, FL
December 2, 2019*; 11:00 am, CUSA.tv		vs. Holy Cross; Boca Raton Beach Classic	L 67–81	4–5	FAU Arena (1,122); Boca Raton, FL
December 7, 2019*; 4:30 pm, ESPN+		Georgia State	L 61–73	4–6	Hawkins Arena (1,564); Macon, GA
December 16, 2019*; 7:00 pm, FloHoops		at UNC Wilmington	W 72–63	5–6	Trask Coliseum (2,423); Wilmington, NC
December 20, 2019; 7:30 pm, ESPN3		Furman	L 62–64	5–7 (0–1)	Hawkins Arena (1,753); Macon, GA
December 22, 2019*; 6:00 pm, ESPN+		Florida Atlantic	L 50–65	5–8	Hawkins Arena (1,932); Macon, GA
December 28, 2019*; 1:00 pm, ESPN3		Milligan	W 104–53	6–8	Hawkins Arena (1,528); Macon, GA
January 1, 2020; 7:00 pm, ESPN+		at UNC Greensboro	L 63–72	6–9 (0–2)	Greensboro Coliseum (2,374); Greensboro, NC
January 4, 2020; 4:30 pm, ESPN3		Chattanooga	W 70–61	6–10 (0–3)	Hawkins Arena (3,326); Macon, GA
January 11, 2020; 5:00 pm, ESPN+		at Western Carolina	L 71–79	6–11 (0–4)	Ramsey Center (2,296); Cullowhee, NC
January 15, 2020; 7:00 pm, ESPN+		VMI	W 72–62	7–11 (1–4)	Hawkins Arena (2,457); Macon, GA
January 18, 2020; 3:00 pm, ESPN3		at Samford	W 90–75	8–11 (2–4)	Pete Hanna Center (763); Homewood, AL
January 22, 2020; 7:00 pm, ESPN+		Western Carolina	W 85–79	9–11 (3–4)	Hawkins Arena (2,572); Macon, GA
January 25, 2020; 1:00 pm, ESPN3/Nexstar		at VMI	W 69–66	10–11 (4–4)	Cameron Hall (2,400); Lexington, VA
January 29, 2020; 7:00 pm, ESPN+		at East Tennessee State	W 71–55	11–11 (5–4)	Freedom Hall Civic Center (4,608); Johnson City, TN
February 1, 2020; 4:30 pm, ESPN3/Nexstar		The Citadel	W 76–71	12–11 (6–4)	Hawkins Arena (4,072); Macon, GA
February 5, 2020; 7:00 pm, ESPN+		at Furman	L 57–79	12–12 (6–5)	Timmons Arena (1,854); Greenville, SC
February 8, 2020; 4:30 pm, ESPN+		East Tennessee State	L 60–73	12–13 (6–6)	Hawkins Arena (3,472); Macon, GA
February 12, 2020; 7:00 pm, ESPN+		at Wofford	W 70–68	13–13 (7–6)	Jerry Richardson Indoor Stadium (1,298); Spartanburg, SC
February 15, 2020; 4:30 pm, ESPN3		UNC Greensboro	L 55–67	13–14 (7–7)	Hawkins Arena (2,972); Macon, GA
February 19, 2020; 7:00 pm, ESPN+		Samford	W 106–66	14–14 (8–7)	Hawkins Arena (2,972); Macon, GA
February 22, 2020; 4:30 pm, ESPN3		at Chattanooga	W 85–80	15–14 (9–7)	McKenzie Arena (3,146); Chattanooga, TN
February 26, 2020; 7:00 pm, ESPN3		at The Citadel	W 73–57	16–14 (10–7)	McAlister Field House (1,112); Charleston, SC
February 29, 2020; 4:30 pm, ESPN+		Wofford	W 59–47	17–14 (11–7)	Hawkins Arena (3,971); Macon, GA
SoCon tournament
March 7, 2020; 2:30 pm, ESPN+	(4)	vs. (5) Western Carolina; Quarterfinals	L 56–70	17–15	Harrah's Cherokee Center (5,573); Asheville, NC
*Non-conference game. ^{#}Rankings from AP Poll. (#) Tournament seedings in parentheses. All times are in Eastern.
