= 2019–20 Furman Paladins men's basketball team =

American college basketball season

2019–20 Furman Paladins men's basketball
- Conference: Southern Conference
- Record: 25–7 (15–3 SoCon)
- Head coach: Bob Richey (3rd season)
- Assistant coaches: Jimmie Williams; Tim Johnson; Jeremy Growe
- Home arena: Timmons Arena

2019–20 Southern Conference men's basketball standings
	Conf.				Overall
Team	W		L	PCT	W		L	PCT
East Tennessee State †	16	–	2	.889	30	–	4	.882
Furman	15	–	3	.833	25	–	7	.781
UNC Greensboro	13	–	5	.722	23	–	9	.719
Mercer	11	–	7	.611	17	–	15	.531
Western Carolina	10	–	8	.556	19	–	12	.613
Chattanooga	10	–	8	.556	20	–	13	.606
Wofford	8	–	10	.444	19	–	16	.543
Samford	4	–	14	.222	10	–	23	.303
VMI	3	–	15	.167	9	–	24	.273
The Citadel	0	–	18	.000	6	–	24	.200
† 2020 SoCon tournament winner

The 2019–20 Furman Paladins men's basketball team represented Furman University in the 2019–20 NCAA Division I men's basketball season. The Paladins, led by third-year head coach Bob Richey, played their home games at Timmons Arena in Greenville, South Carolina as members of the Southern Conference (SoCon). They finished the season 25–7, 15–3 in SoCon play, to finish in second place. They lost in the quarterfinals of the SoCon tournament to Wofford. Although registering 25 wins and being a strong candidate for postseason play, all postseason tournaments were cancelled amid the COVID-19 pandemic.

== Previous season ==
The Paladins finished the 2018–19 season 25–8 overall, 13–5 in SoCon play, to finish in a tie for third place. In the SoCon tournament, they defeated Mercer in the quarterfinals, before losing to UNC Greensboro in the semifinals. They received an at-large bid to the NIT, where they lost to Wichita State in the first round.

For a brief period during the season, Furman was nationally ranked, placing as high as 23rd in December 2018.

== Roster ==
2019–20 Furman Paladins men's basketball team
Players
Coaches

Pos.	#	Name	Height	Weight	Year	Hometown
G	0	Tre Clark	6 ft 5 in (1.96 m)	205 lb (93 kg)	Jr	Palmetto, FL
G	1	Jaylon Pugh	6 ft 0 in (1.83 m)	170 lb (77 kg)	So	Cartersville, GA
G	2	Colin Kenney	6 ft 1 in (1.85 m)	172 lb (78 kg)	Fr	Michigan City, IN
G	3	Mike Bothwell	6 ft 3 in (1.91 m)	190 lb (86 kg)	So	Cleveland Heights, OH
F	4	Noah Gurley	6 ft 8 in (2.03 m)	210 lb (95 kg)	So	Fayetteville, GA
G	5	Marcus Foster	6 ft 4 in (1.93 m)	200 lb (91 kg)	Fr	Atlanta, GA
G	10	Alex Hunter	5 ft 11 in (1.8 m)	175 lb (79 kg)	Jr	Raleigh, NC
G	11	Robert Swanson	5 ft 10 in (1.78 m)	165 lb (75 kg)	So	Myrtle Beach, SC
F	12	Jonny Lawrence	6 ft 10 in (2.08 m)	205 lb (93 kg)	Fr	Orlando, FL
G	14	Rett Lister	6 ft 1 in (1.85 m)	160 lb (73 kg)	Fr	Easley, SC
F	20	Jalen Slawson	6 ft 7 in (2.01 m)	210 lb (95 kg)	So	Summerville, SC
F	21	Ben Beeker	6 ft 9 in (2.06 m)	220 lb (100 kg)	Fr	Hendersonville, NC
G	23	Jordan Lyons	5 ft 11 in (1.8 m)	190 lb (86 kg)	Sr	Peachtree City, GA
F	45	Clay Mounce	6 ft 7 in (2.01 m)	205 lb (93 kg)	Jr	Elkin, NC

Head coach

- Bob Richey (North Greenville)

Assistant coach(es)

- Jimmie Williams (MidAmerica Nazarene)
- Tim Johnson (Wofford)
- Jeremy Growe (Indiana)

Legend

- (C) Team captain
- (S) Suspended
- (I) Ineligible
- (W) Walk-on
- Injured
- Current redshirt

Roster
Last update: August 24, 2024

== Schedule and results ==
Date time, TV	Rank^{#}	Opponent^{#}	Result	Record	Site (attendance) city, state
Non-conference regular season
November 5, 2019*; 7:00 p.m., ESPN+		at Gardner–Webb	W 70–63	1–0	Paul Porter Arena (2,475); Boiling Springs, NC
November 8, 2019*; 7:00 p.m., ESPN+		Loyola–Chicago	W 87–63	2–0	Timmons Arena (2,496); Greenville, SC
November 12, 2019*; 7:30 p.m., ESPN+		at Charleston Southern	W 91–47	3–0	CSU Field House (881); North Charleston, SC
November 15, 2019*; 7:00 p.m., ESPN+		Southern Wesleyan; Battle 4 Atlantis campus-site game	W 83–61	4–0	Timmons Arena (1,667); Greenville, SC
November 19, 2019*; 8:00 p.m., SECN+		at Alabama; Battle 4 Atlantis campus-site game	L 73–81	4–1	Coleman Coliseum (8,763); Tuscaloosa, AL
November 22, 2019*; 7:00 p.m., ESPN+		Columbia International	W 90–45	5–1	Timmons Arena (1,502); Greenville, SC
November 26, 2019*; 7:00 p.m., FloSports		at Elon; Battle 4 Atlantis campus-site game	W 97–61	6–1	Schar Center (1,264); Elon, NC
November 27, 2019*; 3:00 p.m.		vs. UT Arlington; Battle 4 Atlantis campus-site game	W 58–57	7–1	Schar Center; Elon, NC
December 2, 2019*; 7:00 p.m., ESPN+		at South Florida	L 55–65	7–2	Yuengling Center (2,444); Tampa, FL
December 5, 2019*; 9:00 p.m., SECN		at No. 14 Auburn	L 78–81 ^{OT}	7–3	Auburn Arena (8,226); Auburn, AL
December 8, 2019*; 2:00 p.m., ESPN+		USC Upstate	W 84–72	8–3	Timmons Arena (1,510); Greenville, SC
December 11, 2019*; 7:00 p.m., ESPN+		North Greenville	W 90–65	9–3	Timmons Arena (1,378); Greenville, SC
December 14, 2019*; 6:00 p.m., ESPN+		Winthrop	W 80–73	10–3	Timmons Arena (3,740); Greenville, SC
SoCon regular season
December 20, 2019; 7:30 p.m., ESPN3		at Mercer	W 64–62	11–3 (1–0)	Hawkins Arena (3,172); Macon, GA
January 1, 2020; 1:00 p.m., ESPN+		at VMI	W 89–73	12–3 (2–0)	Cameron Hall (950); Lexington, VA
January 4, 2020; 4:00 p.m., ESPN3		East Tennessee State	W 65–56	13–3 (3–0)	Timmons Arena (2,314); Greenville, SC
January 8, 2020; 7:00 p.m., ESPN+		at Chattanooga	W 73–66	14–3 (4–0)	McKenzie Arena (2,815); Chattanooga, TN
January 11, 2020; 7:00 p.m., ESPN3		UNC Greensboro	L 73–86	14–4 (4–1)	Bon Secours Wellness Arena (4,646); Greenville, SC
January 15, 2020; 7:00 p.m., ESPN+		Western Carolina	W 83–79	15–4 (5–1)	Timmons Arena (1,695); Greenville, SC
January 17, 2020; 7:00 p.m., ESPNU		at Wofford	L 54–66	15–5 (5–2)	Jerry Richardson Indoor Stadium (3,400); Spartanburg, SC
January 22, 2020; 7:00 p.m., ESPN+		Samford	W 101–78	16–5 (6–2)	Timmons Arena (1,399); Greenville, SC
January 25, 2020; 1:00 p.m., ESPN3		at The Citadel	W 78–54	17–5 (7–2)	McAlister Field House (1,254); Charleston, SC
January 29, 2020; 7:00 p.m., ESPN+		VMI	W 74–72 ^{OT}	18–5 (8–2)	Timmons Arena (1,512); Greenville, SC
February 5, 2020; 7:00 p.m., ESPN+		Mercer	W 79–57	19–5 (9–2)	Timmons Arena (1,854); Greenville, SC
February 8, 2020; 2:00 p.m., ESPN+		at Western Carolina	W 82–73	20–5 (10–2)	Ramsey Center (2,338); Cullowhee, NC
February 12, 2020; 7:30 p.m., ESPN+		at Samford	W 86–71	21–5 (11–2)	Pete Hanna Center (608); Homewood, AL
February 15, 2020; 4:00 p.m., ESPN3		Chattanooga	W 58–53	22–5 (12–2)	Timmons Arena (2,430); Greenville, SC
February 19, 2020; 7:00 p.m., ESPN+		at East Tennessee State	L 66–75	22–6 (12–3)	Freedom Hall Civic Center (6,177); Johnson City, TN
February 22, 2020; 12:00 p.m., ESPN+		Wofford	W 67–66	23–6 (13–3)	Bon Secours Wellness Arena (6,096); Greenville, SC
February 26, 2020; 7:00 p.m., ESPN+		at UNC Greensboro	W 81–67	24–6 (14–3)	Greensboro Coliseum (4,256); Greensboro, NC
February 29, 2020; 4:00 p.m., ESPN+		The Citadel	W 82–58	25–6 (15–3)	Timmons Arena (2,500); Greenville, SC
SoCon tournament
March 7, 2020; 6:00 p.m., ESPN+	(2)	vs. (7) Wofford; Quarterfinals	L 68–77	25–7	Harrah's Cherokee Center (4,194); Asheville, NC
*Non-conference game. ^{#}Rankings from AP poll. (#) Tournament seedings in parentheses. All times are in Eastern.
