= 2019–20 Chattanooga Mocs men's basketball team =

American college basketball season

2019–20 Chattanooga Mocs men's basketball

Emerald Coast Classic visitors bracket champions
- Conference: Southern Conference
- Record: 20–13 (10–8 SoCon)
- Head coach: Lamont Paris (3rd season)
- Assistant coaches: Tanner Bronson; Eddie Shannon; David McKinley
- Home arena: McKenzie Arena

2019–20 Southern Conference men's basketball standings
| | Conf. | | | | Overall |
| Team | W | | L | PCT | W | | L | PCT |
|---|---|---|---|---|---|---|---|---|
| East Tennessee State † | 16 | – | 2 | .889 | 30 | – | 4 | .882 |
| Furman | 15 | – | 3 | .833 | 25 | – | 7 | .781 |
| UNC Greensboro | 13 | – | 5 | .722 | 23 | – | 9 | .719 |
| Mercer | 11 | – | 7 | .611 | 17 | – | 15 | .531 |
| Western Carolina | 10 | – | 8 | .556 | 19 | – | 12 | .613 |
| Chattanooga | 10 | – | 8 | .556 | 20 | – | 13 | .606 |
| Wofford | 8 | – | 10 | .444 | 19 | – | 16 | .543 |
| Samford | 4 | – | 14 | .222 | 10 | – | 23 | .303 |
| VMI | 3 | – | 15 | .167 | 9 | – | 24 | .273 |
| The Citadel | 0 | – | 18 | .000 | 6 | – | 24 | .200 |
† 2020 SoCon tournament winner

The 2019–20 Chattanooga Mocs men's basketball team represented the University of Tennessee at Chattanooga in the 2019–20 NCAA Division I men's basketball season. The Mocs, led by third-year head coach Lamont Paris, played their home games at McKenzie Arena in Chattanooga, Tennessee, as members of the Southern Conference (SoCon). They finished the season 20–13, 10–8 in SoCon play, to finish in a tie for fifth place. They defeated UNC Greensboro in the quarterfinals of the SoCon tournament before losing in the semifinals to Wofford.

== Previous season ==
The Mocs finished the 2018–19 season 12–20 overall, 7–11 in SoCon play, to finish in fifth place. In the SoCon tournament, they were defeated by East Tennessee State in the first round.

== Roster ==
2019–20 Chattanooga Mocs men's basketball team
Players
Coaches

| Pos. | # | Name | Height | Weight | Year | Hometown |
|---|---|---|---|---|---|---|
| G | 0 | A.J. Caldwell | 6 ft 4 in (1.93 m) | 201 lb (91 kg) | RS So | Sarasota, FL |
| G/F | 1 | Jonathan Scott | 6 ft 4 in (1.93 m) | 200 lb (91 kg) | Sr | Monument, CO |
| G | 2 | Jamaal Walker | 6 ft 4 in (1.93 m) | 180 lb (82 kg) | Fr | Chattanooga, TN |
| G | 3 | David Jean-Baptiste | 6 ft 1 in (1.85 m) | 191 lb (87 kg) | RS Jr | Miami, FL |
| G | 4 | Maurice Commander | 6 ft 0 in (1.83 m) | 167 lb (76 kg) | So | Chicago, IL |
| F | 5 | Jaden Frazier | 6 ft 10 in (2.08 m) | 210 lb (95 kg) | Fr | Pulaski, VA |
| G | 10 | Alex Tostado | 6 ft 2 in (1.88 m) | 180 lb (82 kg) | RS So | Guadalajara, Mexico |
| F | 11 | Rod Johnson | 6 ft 7 in (2.01 m) | 200 lb (91 kg) | RS Jr | Sun Prairie, WI |
| G | 12 | Ashton Smith | 5 ft 8 in (1.73 m) | 165 lb (75 kg) | Fr | Memphis, TN |
| G/F | 14 | Grant Ledford | 6 ft 6 in (1.98 m) | 205 lb (93 kg) | Fr | Knoxville, TN |
| F | 15 | Ramon Vila | 6 ft 8 in (2.03 m) | 242 lb (110 kg) | RS Jr | Barcelona, Spain |
| G | 23 | Trey Doomes | 6 ft 3 in (1.91 m) | 175 lb (79 kg) | So | Acworth, GA |
| F | 24 | Prosper Obidiebube | 6 ft 8 in (2.03 m) | 205 lb (93 kg) | Fr | Lagos, Nigeria |
| C | 25 | Justin Brown | 6 ft 10 in (2.08 m) | 205 lb (93 kg) | RS So | Chicago, IL |
| G/F | 32 | Matt Ryan | 6 ft 7 in (2.01 m) | 215 lb (98 kg) | GS | Cortlandt Manor, NY |
| F | 33 | Stefan Kenić | 6 ft 9 in (2.06 m) | 230 lb (104 kg) | Jr | Belgrade, Serbia |
| G | | Malachi Smith | 6 ft 3 in (1.91 m) | 200 lb (91 kg) | So | Belleville, IL |

Head coach

- Lamont Paris (Wooster)

Assistant coach(es)

- Tanner Bronson (Wisconsin)
- Eddie Shannon (Florida)
- David McKinley (Ohio)

Legend

- (C) Team captain
- (S) Suspended
- (I) Ineligible
- (W) Walk-on
- Injured
- Current redshirt

Roster
Last update: August 4, 2024

== Schedule and results ==
| Date time, TV | Rank^{#} | Opponent^{#} | Result | Record | Site (attendance) city, state |
Exhibition
| October 26, 2019*; 2:00 p.m. | | Covenant | W 86–54 | | McKenzie Arena (2,206); Chattanooga, TN |
Regular season
| November 5, 2019*; 7:00 p.m., ESPN+ | | at Eastern Kentucky | L 68–79 | 0–1 | McBrayer Arena (2,858); Richmond, KY |
| November 9, 2019*; 4:30 p.m. | | Tennessee State | W 59–57 | 1–1 | McKenzie Arena (2,694); Chattanooga, TN |
| November 12, 2019*; 7:00 p.m., ESPN+ | | at Troy | W 74–68 | 2–1 | Trojan Arena (1,917); Troy, AL |
| November 15, 2019*; 7:00 p.m., SoCon Digital Net | | South Alabama | W 90–72 | 3–1 | McKenzie Arena (2,589); Chattanooga, TN |
| November 20, 2019*; 6:30 p.m., Fox Sports South | | at Florida State; Emerald Coast Classic campus-site game | L 53–89 | 3–2 | Donald L. Tucker Center (7,572); Tallahassee, FL |
| November 25, 2019*; 7:00 p.m., SEC Network | | at No. 17 Tennessee; Emerald Coast Classic campus-site game | L 46–58 | 3–3 | Thompson–Boling Arena (18,556); Knoxville, TN |
| November 29, 2019*; 2:30 p.m. | | vs. Alabama State; Emerald Coast Classic visitors bracket semifinals | W 74–56 | 4–3 | The Arena at NWSFC (230); Niceville, FL |
| November 30, 2019*; 2:10 p.m. | | vs. Jacksonville State; Emerald Coast Classic visitors bracket finals | W 74–56 | 5–3 | The Arena at NWSFC (215); Niceville, FL |
| December 3, 2019; 7:00 p.m., ESPN3 | | at Western Carolina | L 77–87 | 5–4 (0–1) | Ramsey Center (2,021); Cullowhee, NC |
| December 8, 2019*; 1:00 p.m., ESPN3 | | Tennessee Wesleyan | W 99–51 | 6–4 | McKenzie Arena (2,223); Chattanooga, TN |
| December 11, 2019*; 7:00 p.m., ACCN | | at Virginia Tech | L 58–63 | 6–5 | Cassell Coliseum (8,348); Blacksburg, VA |
| December 15, 2019*; 4:00 p.m., ESPN+ | | Troy | W 84–80 | 7–5 | McKenzie Arena (2,261); Chattanooga, TN |
| December 21, 2019*; 2:00 p.m., ESPN+ | | at UNC Asheville | W 68–64 | 8–5 | Kimmel Arena (1,449); Asheville, NC |
| December 29, 2019*; 1:30 p.m., ESPN3 | | Cumberland | W 72–42 | 9–5 | McKenzie Arena (2,350); Chattanooga, TN |
| January 4, 2020; 4:30 p.m., ESPN3 | | at Mercer | W 70–61 | 10–5 (1–1) | Hawkins Arena (3,326); Macon, GA |
| January 8, 2020; 7:00 p.m., ESPN+ | | Furman | L 66–73 | 10–6 (1–2) | McKenzie Arena (2,815); Chattanooga, TN |
| January 11, 2020; 2:00 p.m., ESPN3 | | Samford | W 105–67 | 11–6 (2–2) | McKenzie Arena (2,872); Chattanooga, TN |
| January 15, 2020; 7:00 p.m., ESPN+ | | Wofford | W 72–59 | 12–6 (3–2) | McKenzie Arena (2,705); Chattanooga, TN |
| January 18, 2020; 7:00 p.m., ESPN+ | | at UNC Greensboro | L 52–72 | 12–7 (3–3) | Greensboro Coliseum (5,016); Greensboro, NC |
| January 22, 2020; 7:00 p.m., ESPN+ | | The Citadel | W 92–69 | 13–7 (4–3) | McKenzie Arena (2,477); Chattanooga, TN |
| January 25, 2020; 4:00 p.m., ESPN+ | | at East Tennessee State | L 64–75 | 13–8 (4–4) | Freedom Hall Civic Center (6,086); Johnson City, TN |
| January 29, 2020; 7:30 p.m., ESPN+ | | at Samford | W 92–84 | 14–8 (5–4) | Pete Hanna Center (703); Homewood, AL |
| February 1, 2020; 2:00 p.m., ESPN3 | | Western Carolina | L 61–64 | 14–9 (5–5) | McKenzie Arena (3,188); Chattanooga, TN |
| February 5, 2020; 7:00 p.m., ESPN+ | | East Tennessee State | L 64–80 | 14–10 (5–6) | McKenzie Arena (2,823); Chattanooga, TN |
| February 8, 2020; 7:00 p.m., Nexstar/ESPN+ | | at Wofford | W 84–77 | 15–10 (6–6) | Jerry Richardson Indoor Stadium (1,920); Spartanburg, SC |
| February 12, 2020; 7:00 p.m., ESPN+ | | VMI | W 86–67 | 16–10 (7–6) | McKenzie Arena (2,605); Chattanooga, TN |
| February 15, 2020; 4:00 p.m., ESPN3 | | at Furman | L 53–58 | 16–11 (7–7) | Timmons Arena (2,430); Greenville, SC |
| February 19, 2020; 7:00 p.m., ESPN+ | | at The Citadel | W 91–68 | 17–11 (8–7) | McAlister Field House (622); Charleston, SC |
| February 22, 2020; 4:30 p.m., ESPN3 | | Mercer | L 80–85 | 17–12 (8–8) | McKenzie Arena (3,146); Chattanooga, TN |
| February 26, 2020; 7:00 p.m., ESPN+ | | at VMI | W 71–64 | 18–12 (9–8) | Cameron Hall (900); Lexington, VA |
| February 29, 2020; 4:30 p.m., ESPN+ | | UNC Greensboro | W 74–72 | 19–12 (10–8) | McKenzie Arena (3,565); Chattanooga, TN |
SoCon tournament
| March 7, 2020; 8:30 p.m., ESPN+ | (6) | vs. (3) UNC Greensboro; Quarterfinals | W 78–68 | 20–12 | Harrah's Cherokee Center (4,194); Asheville, NC |
| March 8, 2020; 6:30 p.m., ESPN+ | (6) | vs. (7) Wofford; Semifinals | L 70–72 | 20–13 | Harrah's Cherokee Center (6,132); Asheville, NC |
*Non-conference game. ^{#}Rankings from AP poll. (#) Tournament seedings in parentheses. All times are in Eastern.

== See also ==
- 2019–20 Chattanooga Mocs women's basketball team
