= Carlos Dotson =

American basketball player (born 1996)

Personal information
- Born: September 20, 1996 (age 30)
- Listed height: 6 ft 7 in (2.01 m)
- Listed weight: 270 lb (122 kg)

Career information
- High school: Paul M. Dorman (Roebuck, South Carolina)
- College: Anderson (2015–2017); College of Central Florida (2017–2018); Western Carolina (2018–2020)
- NBA draft: 2020: undrafted
- Playing career: 2020–2022
- Position: Power forward
- Coaching career: 2021–present

Career history

Playing
- 2020: JSA Bordeaux Basket
- 2021: Club Trouville
- 2021: Charlotte Tribe
- 2021–2022: U.D. Oliveirense

Coaching
- 2021: Clemson (graduate assistant)
- 2022–2023: Charlotte Hornets (assistant video coordinator)
- 2023–2024: Los Angeles Clippers (player development coach)
- 2024–present: UCF (assistant)

Career highlights
- First-team All-SoCon (2020); Third-team All-SoCon (2019)

Carlos Dotson (born September 20, 1996) is an American basketball coach for UCF of the Big 12 Conference. He played college basketball for the Anderson Trojans, the College of Central Florida Patriots, and the Western Carolina Catamounts.

== High school career ==
Dotson grew up in Riverdale Park, Maryland, but moved to South Carolina to attend Paul M. Dorman High School. He was cut from the basketball team as a freshman, but made the team as a sophomore. As a senior, Dotson averaged 13 points and 10 rebounds per game, leading the team to a 20–5 record. He was selected to the North-South All-Star game where he scored 14 points. Dotson also played defensive end on the football team before focusing on basketball. He committed to play college basketball at Anderson, choosing the Trojans over Lincoln Memorial, among other Division II offers.

== College career ==
Dotson played sparingly as a freshman at Anderson as he was hampered by ankle injuries and took a medical redshirt. As a redshirt freshman, he averaged 10.9 points and 8.1 rebounds per game, shooting 56.5 percent from the floor. Dotson earned South Atlantic Conference All-Freshman Team honors. For his sophomore season, he transferred to the College of Central Florida. Dotson averaged 13.3 points and 7.8 rebounds per game for the Patriots while shooting 60.3 percent. He transferred to Western Carolina prior to his junior season. Dotson averaged 13.9 points and 9.5 rebounds per game as a junior, earning Third Team All-SoCon honors. On February 12, 2020, he scored a career-high 32 points and had 12 rebounds in a 82–62 loss to UNC Greensboro. As a senior, Dotson averaged 15.5 points and 9.7 rebounds per game and had 18 double-doubles. He was named to the First Team All-SoCon, the SoCon All-Tournament Team, and the Lou Henson All-America Team.

== Professional career ==
On October 7, 2020, Dotson signed his first professional contract with JSA Bordeaux Basket of the Nationale Masculine 1. In four games, he averaged 7.3 points and 3.0 rebounds per game. On March 10, 2021, Dotson signed with Club Trouville of the Liga Uruguaya de Básquetbol. In the summer of 2021, he joined the Charlotte Tribe of the East Coast Basketball League. On November 26, Dotson signed with U.D. Oliveirense of the Liga Portuguesa de Basquetebol.

== Coaching career ==
Dotson joined Clemson as a graduate assistant for the 2021–22 season. He left the team in late November 2021 to continue his professional career. In August 2022, Dotson was hired as a basketball operations assistant by the Charlotte Hornets and later become Charlotte’s assistant video coordinator in 2023. The Los Angeles Clippers hired Dotson to become the player development coach in 2023. In May 2024, he was hired as an assistant coach at UCF under Johnny Dawkins.

== Career statistics ==
Legend
| GP | Games played | GS | Games started | MPG | Minutes per game |
| FG% | Field goal percentage | 3P% | 3-point field goal percentage | FT% | Free throw percentage |
| RPG | Rebounds per game | APG | Assists per game | SPG | Steals per game |
| BPG | Blocks per game | PPG | Points per game | **Bold** | Career high |

=== College ===
==== NCAA Division I ====
| Year | Team | GP | GS | MPG | FG% | 3P% | FT% | RPG | APG | SPG | BPG | PPG |
|---|---|---|---|---|---|---|---|---|---|---|---|---|
| 2018–19 | Western Carolina | **31** | 28 | **27.7** | .596 | .000 | .526 | 9.5 | 1.5 | **.7** | **.5** | 13.9 |
| 2019–20 | Western Carolina | 30 | **29** | 27.2 | **.610** | – | **.573** | **9.7** | **1.9** | .6 | .2 | **15.5** |
| Career | | 61 | 57 | 27.5 | .603 | .000 | .551 | 9.6 | 1.7 | .7 | .3 | 14.7 |

==== NCAA Division II ====
| Year | Team | GP | GS | MPG | FG% | 3P% | FT% | RPG | APG | SPG | BPG | PPG |
|---|---|---|---|---|---|---|---|---|---|---|---|---|
| 2015–16 | Anderson | 4 | 0 | 7.0 | **.600** | – | .286 | 1.3 | **.3** | .0 | .3 | 2.0 |
| 2016–17 | Anderson | **29** | **29** | **26.1** | .565 | – | **.486** | **8.1** | **.3** | **.8** | **.6** | **10.9** |
| Career | | 33 | 29 | 23.8 | .565 | – | .475 | 7.3 | .3 | .7 | .6 | 9.8 |

==== JUCO ====
| Year | Team | GP | GS | MPG | FG% | 3P% | FT% | RPG | APG | SPG | BPG | PPG |
|---|---|---|---|---|---|---|---|---|---|---|---|---|
| 2017–18 | College of Central Florida | 32 | 32 | 24.5 | .603 | .000 | .530 | 7.8 | .8 | 1.0 | .4 | 13.3 |
