= Steve Forbes (basketball) =

American college basketball coach (born 1965)

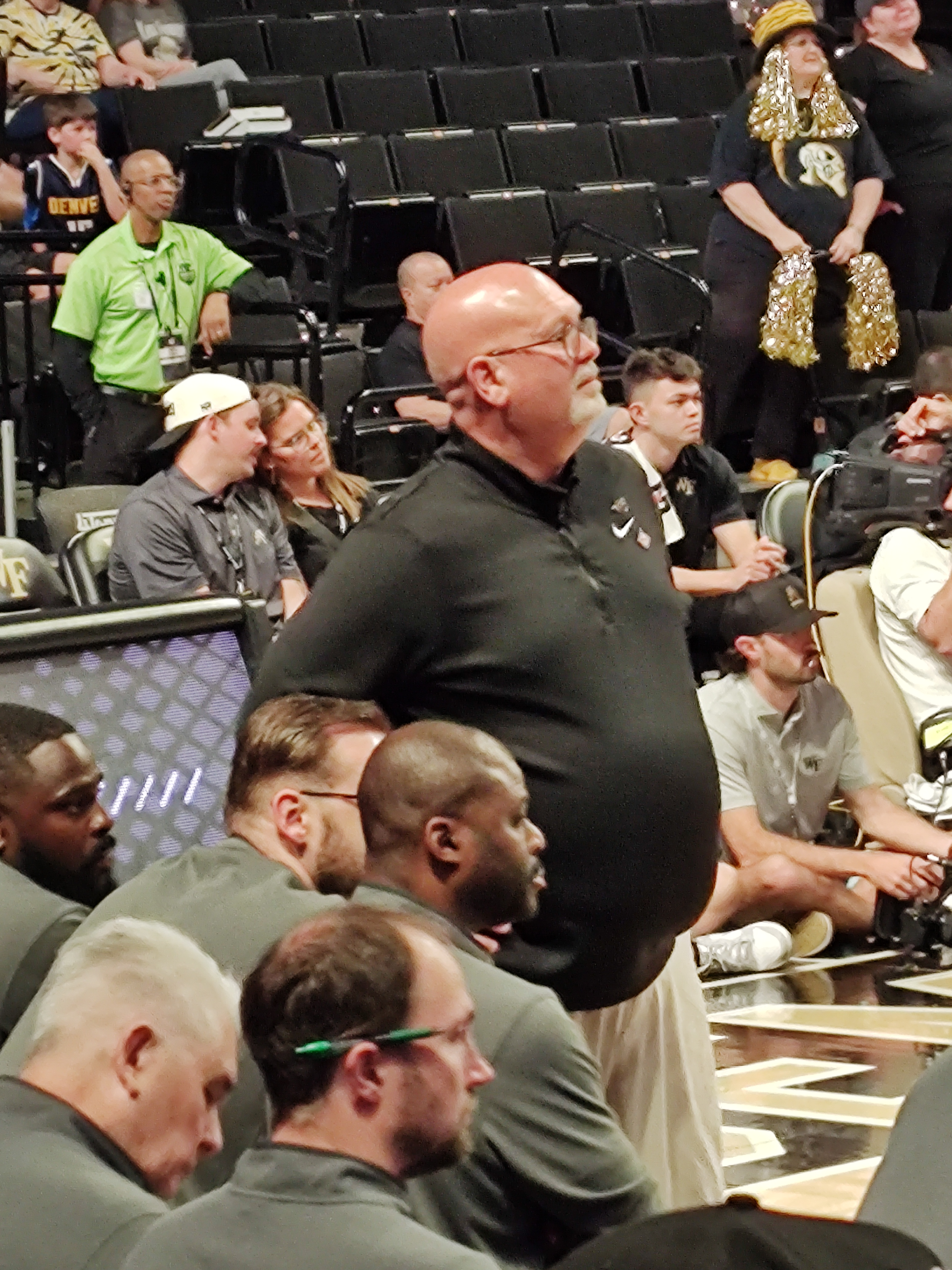

Current position
- Title: Head coach
- Team: Wake Forest
- Conference: ACC
- Record: 115–83 (.581)

Biographical details
- Born: March 22, 1965 (age 61); Lone Tree, Iowa, U.S.
- Education: Southern Arkansas ('88)

Coaching career (HC unless noted)
- 1989–1991: Southwestern CC (assistant)
- 1991–1993: Southwestern CC
- 1993–1995: Barton County CC (assistant)
- 1995–1998: Barton County CC
- 1998–2000: Idaho (assistant)
- 2000–2003: Louisiana Tech (assistant)
- 2003–2004: Illinois State (assistant)
- 2004–2006: Texas A&M (assistant)
- 2006–2011: Tennessee (assistant)
- 2011–2013: Northwest Florida State
- 2013–2015: Wichita State (assistant)
- 2015–2020: East Tennessee State
- 2020–present: Wake Forest

Head coaching record
- Overall: 245–126 (.660) (NCAA); 130–34 (.793) (NJCAA)
- Tournaments: 0–1 (NCAA); 4–3 (NIT); 0–1 (CIT); 1–1 (Vegas 16)

Accomplishments and honors

Championships
- 2× SoCon regular season (2017, 2020); 2× SoCon tournament (2017, 2020)

Awards
- Hugh Durham Award (2020); SoCon Coach of the Year (2020); ACC Coach of the Year (2022)

Steve Forbes (born March 22, 1965) is an American men's college basketball head coach for the Wake Forest Demon Deacons. His Division I experience includes five years at East Tennessee State, two seasons at Texas A&M, one year at Illinois State, three years at Louisiana Tech, and two years at Idaho.

== Early life ==
A native of Lone Tree, Iowa, Forbes graduated from Southern Arkansas University with a degree in secondary education in 1988. A former baseball student-athlete for the Muleriders, Forbes spent one year at his alma mater as the sports information director before embarking on a coaching career.

== Coaching career ==
=== Early career ===
After spending two years (1989–91) as an assistant coach at Southwestern Community College in Creston, Iowa, Forbes was promoted to head coach in March 1991.

In 1993, Forbes started coaching as an assistant at Barton County Community College in Great Bend, Kansas, and then was promoted to the head coach of the team in 1995. During his three seasons competing in the Jayhawk Conference, the Cougars produced three All-Americas, twice finished the season with a national ranking and earned victories over 15 nationally-ranked teams. Overall, he compiled a 68–28 record in three years (1995–98) as the head coach of the Cougars.

In 1998, Forbes joined the Idaho coaching staff as an assistant coach before being promoted to associate head coach for the 1998–99 season. In his first season, the Vandals improved to 16–11 and signed a nationally-ranked recruiting class.

Forbes spent three years at Louisiana Tech (2000–03), where he helped sign two nationally-ranked recruiting classes, including a top-10 class in 2003. In 2002 the Bulldogs posted a 22–10 record and went 2–1 in the National Invitation Tournament, their first postseason appearance in 10 years. He also coached at Illinois State (2003–04) before joining Billy Gillispie's coaching staff at Texas A&M.

=== Texas A&M ===
In 2004, Forbes started coaching as an assistant coach at Texas A&M under Billy Gillispie. He helped turn the Aggies from a team that had posted a 7–21 record the previous season and hadn't received a postseason invitation in 11 years, to a program that averaged more than 21 wins in his two seasons and advanced to postseason play both years.

A&M posted back-to-back seasons with the most Big 12 Conference wins in school history with Forbes on the bench. Picked to finish last in the Big 12 prior to the 2004–05 season, the Aggies won their first 11 games and went on to a 21–10 record and made an appearance in the National Invitation Tournament. In 2005–06, Texas A&M advanced to the NCAA Tournament for the first time since 1987 while recording a 22–9 record, the third-most wins in school history. The Aggies defeated Syracuse in the first round of the NCAA Tournament before falling to eventual Final Four participant LSU on a last-second shot.

Texas A&M's recruiting also benefited from Forbes' experience, as each of the Aggie's two recruiting classes during his time in College Station were ranked among the top 10 in the nation.

=== Tennessee ===
After spending two seasons at Texas A&M, Forbes came to Tennessee in 2006 as an assistant coach under Bruce Pearl. In the five seasons at Tennessee, Forbes helped coach the Vols to an average of 26 wins per year, and advanced to five consecutive NCAA Tournaments – making three Sweet Sixteen appearances and advancing to the program's first-ever Elite Eight in 2010.

Tennessee won a school-record 31 games in 2008, and their 14–2 league record gave the program its first outright SEC championship in more than 40 years. Following a 66–62 win at top-ranked Memphis on February 23, 2008, UT earned the first No. 1 ranking in school history.

Forbes’ experience also helped Tennessee's 2006, 2008 and 2010 recruiting classes to a top 10 national ranking by multiple ratings services. In 2011, Forbes moved on from the Tennessee program when Bruce Pearl and his staff (including Forbes) were fired amidst NCAA recruiting violations committed by Pearl.

=== Northwest Florida State ===
In 2011, the same year Forbes was fired from Tennessee, he was hired by Northwest Florida State, a junior college, as the head coach of their program. During his two-year tenure in Niceville, Florida, he coached the Raiders to a 62–6 record and had five of his junior college players transfer to Division I schools in the offseason.

=== Wichita State ===
Forbes' performance at Northwest Florida State caught the attention of Wichita State Shockers head basketball coach Gregg Marshall, who hired him as an assistant in 2013. At Wichita State, Forbes helped coach the Shockers to two of the most successful seasons in program history.

In 2013–14, Wichita State won an NCAA record 35-straight games before losing to eventual National Runner-up Kentucky in the third round of the NCAA Tournament. The Shockers' 35–1 record also shattered all of WSU's and the MVC's winning streak records, including Indiana State's 33-game record in 1977. WSU entered the NCAA Tournament as a No. 1 seed, a first for the program.

In 2014–15, Wichita State went 30–5 on the season and recorded its third consecutive season of 30 wins or more. The No. 7-seeded Shockers advanced to the Sweet 16 before falling to No. 3 seed and ACC champion Notre Dame.

=== East Tennessee State ===
On March 30, 2015, Forbes was named the new head coach of the East Tennessee State men's basketball team. He was the 16th head coach in the program’s 95-year history, and was hired after former coach Murry Bartow was let go. His recruiting ties and his extensive background as an assistant coach at the NCAA Division I level made him the perfect fit for the ETSU program according to the school's athletic director, Dr. Richard Sander.

The hiring of Forbes was named one of the best offseason coaching hires of 2015 by CBS Sports. Forbes secured his first signature win on November 22, 2015 defeating Georgia Tech in Atlanta by a score of 69–68. On March 4, 2020, Forbes was named Southern Conference Coach of the Year.

In his final season at ETSU (2019–20), Forbes’ team beat LSU on the road in convincing fashion, won the Southern Conference and conference tournament, and set a school record for wins (30–4 overall) that also marked the first and only 30-win season in school history. ETSU gained attention as a potential bracket-busting team in the NCAA tournament (before it was ultimately cancelled due to the COVID-19 pandemic).

=== Wake Forest ===
On April 30, 2020, Forbes was hired as head coach at Wake Forest University by John Currie, replacing Danny Manning. After his second season at Wake Forest, Forbes was named the ACC Coach of the Year for 2021–22.

== Head coaching record ==
=== NJCAA ===
Record table
Season	Team	Overall	Conference	Standing	Postseason
Barton County Community College (Kansas Jayhawk Community College Conference) (1995–1998)
1995–96	Barton County Community College	15–16	5–7		
1996–97	Barton County Community College	24–8	11–5		
1997–98	Barton County Community College	29–4	14–2		
Barton County Community College:		68–28 (.708)	30–14 (.682)		
Northwest Florida State College (Panhandle Conference) (2011–2013)
2011–12	Northwest Florida State	32–2	11–1	1st	NJCAA DI National Runner-Up
2012–13	Northwest Florida State	30–4	11–1	1st	NJCAA DI National Runner-Up
Northwest Florida State:		62–6 (.912)	22–2 (.917)		
Total:		130–34 (.793)			
National champion Postseason invitational champion Conference regular season champion Conference regular season and conference tournament champion Division regular season champion Division regular season and conference tournament champion Conference tournament champion

=== NCAA DI ===
Record table
Season	Team	Overall	Conference	Standing	Postseason
East Tennessee State (Southern Conference) (2015–2020)
2015–16	East Tennessee State	24–12	14–4	2nd	Vegas 16 semifinals
2016–17	East Tennessee State	27–8	14–4	T–1st	NCAA Division I Round of 64
2017–18	East Tennessee State	25–9	14–4	2nd	
2018–19	East Tennessee State	24–10	13–5	T–3rd	CIT first round
2019–20	East Tennessee State	30–4	16–2	1st	NCAA Tournament cancelled due to COVID-19
East Tennessee State:		130–43 (.751)	71–19 (.789)		
Wake Forest (Atlantic Coast Conference) (2020–present)
2020–21	Wake Forest	6–16	3–15	14th	
2021–22	Wake Forest	25–10	13–7	5th	NIT Quarterfinals
2022–23	Wake Forest	19–14	10–10	T–8th	
2023–24	Wake Forest	21–14	11–9	T–5th	NIT Second Round
2024–25	Wake Forest	21–11	13–7	T–4th	
2025–26	Wake Forest	18–17	7–11	13th	NIT Second Round
2026–27	Wake Forest	5–1	0–0		
Wake Forest:		115–83 (.581)	57–59 (.491)		
Total:		245–126 (.660)			
National champion Postseason invitational champion Conference regular season champion Conference regular season and conference tournament champion Division regular season champion Division regular season and conference tournament champion Conference tournament champion

== Personal life ==
Forbes and his wife, Johnetta, have three children: Elizabeth, Christopher, and Johnathon.
