= 2019–20 Wofford Terriers men's basketball team =

American college basketball season

2019–20 Wofford Terriers men's basketball
- Conference: Southern Conference
- Record: 19–16 (8–10 SoCon)
- Head coach: Jay McAuley (1st season)
- Assistant coaches: Dwight Perry; Paul Hemrick; Will Murphy
- Home arena: Jerry Richardson Indoor Stadium

2019–20 Southern Conference men's basketball standings
	Conf.				Overall
Team	W		L	PCT	W		L	PCT
East Tennessee State †	16	–	2	.889	30	–	4	.882
Furman	15	–	3	.833	25	–	7	.781
UNC Greensboro	13	–	5	.722	23	–	9	.719
Mercer	11	–	7	.611	17	–	15	.531
Western Carolina	10	–	8	.556	19	–	12	.613
Chattanooga	10	–	8	.556	20	–	13	.606
Wofford	8	–	10	.444	19	–	16	.543
Samford	4	–	14	.222	10	–	23	.303
VMI	3	–	15	.167	9	–	24	.273
The Citadel	0	–	18	.000	6	–	24	.200
† 2020 SoCon tournament winner

The 2019–20 Wofford Terriers men's basketball team represented Wofford College in the 2019–20 NCAA Division I men's basketball season. The Terriers, led by first-year head coach Jay McAuley, played their home games at Jerry Richardson Indoor Stadium in Spartanburg, South Carolina as members of the Southern Conference (SoCon). They finished the season 19–16, 8–10 in SoCon play, to finish in seventh place. They defeated The Citadel, Furman and Chattanooga to advance to the championship game of the SoCon tournament where they lost to East Tennessee State.

== Previous season ==
The Terriers finished the 2018–19 season 30–5 overall, 18–0 in SoCon play, to finish as SoCon regular-season champions. On February 25, the Terriers entered the AP poll at No. 24, earning their first AP poll appearance in program history. In the SoCon tournament, they defeated VMI in the quarterfinals, East Tennessee State in the semifinals, advancing to the championship, where they defeated UNC Greensboro, finishing with a perfect conference record, and earning the SoCon's automatic bid into the NCAA tournament. In the NCAA tournament, they received the No. 7 seed in the Midwest Region, where they were matched up against No. 10 seeded Seton Hall in the first round, winning the game by a final score of 84–68, earning their first NCAA tournament win in program history. They faced No. 2 seeded Kentucky in the second round, losing 56–62, ending their most successful season in program history.

On April 7, 2019, it was announced that head coach Mike Young was named the new head coach at Virginia Tech. A week later, on April 14, assistant coach Jay McAuley was promoted to head coach.

== Roster ==
2019–20 Wofford Terriers men's basketball team
Players
Coaches

Pos.	#	Name	Height	Weight	Year	Hometown
G	0	Zion Richardson	6 ft 4 in (1.93 m)	208 lb (94 kg)	Fr	Plano, TX
F	1	Chevez Goodwin	6 ft 9 in (2.06 m)	215 lb (98 kg)	Jr	Blythewood, SC
F/C	2	Michael Jr. Manning	6 ft 9 in (2.06 m)	210 lb (95 kg)	Jr	Memphis, TN
G	4	Isaiah Bigelow	6 ft 7 in (2.01 m)	185 lb (84 kg)	Fr	Greensboro, NC
G	5	Storm Murphy	6 ft 0 in (1.83 m)	180 lb (82 kg)	Jr	Middleton, WI
G	10	Nathan Hoover	6 ft 4 in (1.93 m)	185 lb (84 kg)	Sr	Memphis, TN
G	11	Ryan Larson	6 ft 1 in (1.85 m)	175 lb (79 kg)	So	St. Paul, MN
F	12	Alex Michael	6 ft 6 in (1.98 m)	205 lb (93 kg)	So	Greensboro, NC
G	13	Morgan Safford	6 ft 4 in (1.93 m)	190 lb (86 kg)	Fr	Columbus, OH
G	14	Drew Cottrell	6 ft 4 in (1.93 m)	190 lb (86 kg)	So	Flowery Branch, GA
G	15	Trevor Stumpe	6 ft 5 in (1.96 m)	215 lb (98 kg)	Sr	Plainfield, IL
C	20	David Appelgren	7 ft 1 in (2.16 m)	238 lb (108 kg)	So	Stockholm, Sweden
G	21	Tray Hollowell	6 ft 2 in (1.88 m)	185 lb (84 kg)	Jr	Hopkinsville, KY
G	22	Jonathan Steelman	6 ft 3 in (1.91 m)	170 lb (77 kg)	Fr	Aiken, SC
F	25	Messiah Jones	6 ft 6 in (1.98 m)	215 lb (98 kg)	Fr	Chicago, IL
G	31	Donovan Theme-Love	6 ft 1 in (1.85 m)	190 lb (86 kg)	Sr	Providence, RI

Head coach

- Jay McAuley (Georgia)

Assistant coach(es)

- Dwight Perry (Kentucky)
- Paul Hemrick (Georgia)
- Will Murphy (Wake Forest)

Legend

- (C) Team captain
- (S) Suspended
- (I) Ineligible
- (W) Walk-on
- Injured
- Current redshirt

Roster
Last update: December 1, 2019

== Schedule and results ==
Date time, TV	Rank^{#}	Opponent^{#}	Result	Record	Site (attendance) city, state
Non-conference regular season
November 5, 2019*; 7:00 p.m., ESPN3		Erskine College	W 86–63	1–0	Jerry Richardson Indoor Stadium (2,324); Spartanburg, SC
November 9, 2019*; 7:00 p.m., ESPN3		High Point	W 89–61	2–0	Jerry Richardson Indoor Stadium; Spartanburg, SC
November 12, 2019*; 7:00 p.m., ESPN+		William & Mary; Hall of Fame Classic campus-site game	L 79–80	2–1	Jerry Richardson Indoor Stadium (1,840); Spartanburg, SC
November 16, 2019*; 8:00 p.m., FS2		at Butler; Hall of Fame Classic campus-site game	L 61–80	2–2	Hinkle Fieldhouse (8,054); Indianapolis, IN
November 18, 2019*; 8:00 p.m., SECN+		at Missouri; Hall of Fame Classic campus-site game	L 56–75	2–3	Mizzou Arena (8,144); Columbia, MO
November 21, 2019*; 7:00 p.m., ESPN3		at South Florida	L 55–69	2–4	Yuengling Center (2,912); Tampa, FL
November 26, 2019*; 6:00 p.m.		at Maryland Eastern Shore; Hall of Fame Classic	W 67–42	3–4	Hytche Athletic Center (300); Princess Anne, MD
December 2, 2019*; 7:00 p.m., ESPN+		North Carolina Central	W 77–59	4–4	Jerry Richardson Indoor Stadium (1,241); Spartanburg, SC
December 7, 2019*; 7:00 p.m.		Gardner–Webb	W 81–77	5–4	Jerry Richardson Indoor Stadium (1,389); Spartanburg, SC
December 13, 2019*; 7:00 p.m.		North Greenville	W 112–66	6–4	Jerry Richardson Indoor Stadium (1,255); Spartanburg, SC
December 15, 2019*; 4:00 p.m., ACCN		at No. 17 North Carolina	W 68–64	7–4	Carmichael Arena (6,272); Chapel Hill, NC
December 19, 2019*; 7:00 p.m., ESPN2		at No. 4 Duke	L 57–86	7–5	Cameron Indoor Stadium (9,314); Durham, NC
December 22, 2019*; 2:00 p.m., ESPN+		at Kennesaw State	W 83–70	8–5	KSU Convocation Center (801); Kennesaw, GA
SoCon regular season
January 1, 2020; 4:00 p.m., ESPN+		at East Tennessee State	L 48–49	8–6 (0–1)	Freedom Hall Civic Center (5,274); Johnson City, TN
January 4, 2020; 7:00 p.m., ESPN+		UNC Greensboro	W 98–92 ^{2OT}	9–6 (1–1)	Jerry Richardson Indoor Stadium (2,226); Spartanburg, SC
January 8, 2020; 7:30 p.m., ESPN+		at Samford	W 67–62	10–6 (2–1)	Pete Hanna Center (531); Homewood, AL
January 11, 2020; 7:00 p.m., ESPN3		The Citadel	W 73–71	11–6 (3–1)	Jerry Richardson Indoor Stadium (2,153); Spartanburg, SC
January 15, 2020; 7:00 p.m., ESPN+		at Chattanooga	L 59–72	11–7 (3–2)	McKenzie Arena (2,705); Chattanooga, TN
January 17, 2020; 7:00 p.m., ESPNU		Furman	W 66–52	12–7 (4–2)	Jerry Richardson Indoor Stadium (3,400); Spartanburg, SC
January 22, 2020; 7:00 p.m., ESPN+		VMI	W 66–54	13–7 (5–2)	Jerry Richardson Indoor Stadium (1,487); Spartanburg, SC
January 25, 2020; 7:00 p.m., ESPN3		at Western Carolina	L 72–81	13–8 (5–3)	Ramsey Center (3,809); Cullowhee, NC
January 29, 2020; 7:00 p.m., ESPN+		at The Citadel	W 79–56	14–8 (6–3)	McAlister Field House (1,263); Charleston, SC
February 1, 2020; 7:00 p.m., ESPN3		Samford	W 80–56	15–8 (7–3)	Jerry Richardson Indoor Stadium (2,191); Spartanburg, SC
February 5, 2020; 7:00 p.m., ESPN+		at VMI	W 79–73	16–8 (8–3)	Cameron Hall (1,500); Lexington, VA
February 8, 2020; 7:00 p.m., ESPN+		Chattanooga	L 77–84	16–9 (8–4)	Jerry Richardson Indoor Stadium (1,920); Spartanburg, SC
February 12, 2020; 7:00 p.m., ESPN+		Mercer	L 68–70	16–10 (8–5)	Jerry Richardson Indoor Stadium (1,298); Spartanburg, SC
February 15, 2020; 7:00 p.m., ESPN+		Western Carolina	L 74–80	16–11 (8–6)	Jerry Richardson Indoor Stadium (2,365); Spartanburg, SC
February 19, 2020; 7:00 p.m., ESPN+		at UNC Greensboro	L 79–83 ^{OT}	16–12 (8–7)	Greensboro Coliseum (3,417); Greensboro, NC
February 22, 2020; 12:00 p.m., ESPN+		at Furman	L 66–67	16–13 (8–8)	Bon Secours Wellness Arena (6,096); Greenville, SC
February 26, 2020; 7:00 p.m., ESPN+		East Tennessee State	L 54–60	16–14 (8–9)	Jerry Richardson Indoor Stadium (2,345); Spartanburg, SC
February 29, 2020; 4:30 p.m., ESPN+		at Mercer	L 47–59	16–15 (8–10)	Hawkins Arena (3,971); Macon, GA
SoCon tournament
March 6, 2020; 7:30 p.m., ESPN+	(7)	vs. (10) The Citadel; First round	W 93–76	17–15	Harrah's Cherokee Center (2,338); Asheville, NC
March 7, 2020; 6:00 p.m., ESPN+	(7)	vs. (2) Furman; Quarterfinals	W 77–68	18–15	Harrah's Cherokee Center (4,194); Asheville, NC
March 8, 2020; 6:30 p.m., ESPN+	(7)	vs. (6) Chattanooga; Semifinals	W 72–70	19–15	Harrah's Cherokee Center (6,132); Asheville, NC
March 9, 2020; 7:00 p.m., ESPN	(7)	vs. (1) East Tennessee State; Championship	L 58–72	19–16	Harrah's Cherokee Center (6,400); Asheville, NC
*Non-conference game. ^{#}Rankings from AP poll. (#) Tournament seedings in parentheses. All times are in Eastern.
