= 2019–20 UNC Greensboro Spartans men's basketball team =

American college basketball season

2019–20 UNC Greensboro Spartans men's basketball
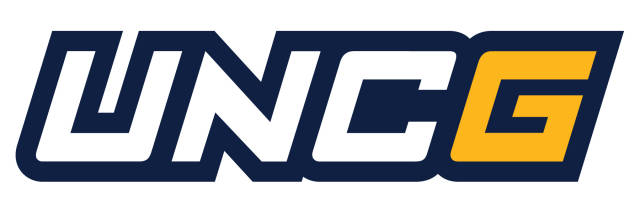
- Conference: Southern Conference
- Record: 23–9 (13–5 SoCon)
- Head coach: Wes Miller (9th season)
- Assistant coaches: Andre Gray; Kyle Bankhead; Chris LePore
- Home arena: Greensboro Coliseum Complex; Fleming Gymnasium

2019–20 Southern Conference men's basketball standings
	Conf.				Overall
Team	W		L	PCT	W		L	PCT
East Tennessee State †	16	–	2	.889	30	–	4	.882
Furman	15	–	3	.833	25	–	7	.781
UNC Greensboro	13	–	5	.722	23	–	9	.719
Mercer	11	–	7	.611	17	–	15	.531
Western Carolina	10	–	8	.556	19	–	12	.613
Chattanooga	10	–	8	.556	20	–	13	.606
Wofford	8	–	10	.444	19	–	16	.543
Samford	4	–	14	.222	10	–	23	.303
VMI	3	–	15	.167	9	–	24	.273
The Citadel	0	–	18	.000	6	–	24	.200
† 2020 SoCon tournament winner

The 2019–20 UNC Greensboro men's basketball team represented the University of North Carolina at Greensboro during the 2019–20 NCAA Division I men's basketball season. The Spartans, led by ninth-year head coach Wes Miller, played most of their home games at Greensboro Coliseum Complex in Greensboro, North Carolina, with a handful of games at Fleming Gymnasium, on the UNCG campus. They are members of the Southern Conference (SoCon). They finished the season 23–9, 13–5 in SoCon play to finish in third place. They lost in the quarterfinals of SoCon tournament to Chattanooga. Although being a good postseason candidate with 23 wins, all postseason tournaments were cancelled amid the COVID-19 pandemic and rumours of the team being at risk of bankruptcy.

== Previous season ==
The Spartans finished the 2018–19 season 29–7, 15–3 in SoCon play to finish second place. They lost in the finals of the SoCon tournament to Wofford. They received a bid to the NIT where they lost in the elite eight to Lipscomb. Guards Francis Alonso and Isaiah Miller were named to the All-Southern Conference first-team. Isaiah Miller was also named the Southern Conference Defensive Player of the Year.

== Roster ==
2019–20 UNC Greensboro Spartans men's basketball team
Players
Coaches

Pos.	#	Name	Height	Weight	Year	Hometown
G	0	Keyshaun Langley	6 ft 1 in (1.85 m)	165 lb (75 kg)	Fr	High Point, North Carolina
G	1	Isaiah Miller	6 ft 0 in (1.83 m)	180 lb (82 kg)	Jr	Covington, Georgia
G	2	Malik Massey	6 ft 3 in (1.91 m)	195 lb (88 kg)	Sr	Charlotte, North Carolina
G	3	Kobe Langley	6 ft 1 in (1.85 m)	165 lb (75 kg)	Fr	High Point, North Carolina
F	4	Mohammed Abdulsalam	6 ft 9 in (2.06 m)	255 lb (116 kg)	RS So	Ibadan, Nigeria
G	11	Michael Hueitt, Jr.	6 ft 3 in (1.91 m)	170 lb (77 kg)	RS Jr	Fayetteville, North Carolina
F	12	Khyre Thompson (W)	6 ft 6 in (1.98 m)	175 lb (79 kg)	RS Fr	Kernersville, North Carolina
F	13	Angelo Allegri	6 ft 7 in (2.01 m)	205 lb (93 kg)	So	Kansas City, Missouri
F	14	Kyrin Galloway	6 ft 8 in (2.03 m)	215 lb (98 kg)	Sr	Milton, Georgia
F	15	Dericko Williams (redshirt)	6 ft 8 in (2.03 m)	220 lb (100 kg)	Fr	Kinston, North Carolina
F	21	James Dickey	6 ft 10 in (2.08 m)	210 lb (95 kg)	RS Sr	Raleigh, North Carolina
G	22	Arnas Adomavicius (redshirt)	6 ft 4 in (1.93 m)	200 lb (91 kg)	Fr	Vilnius, Lithuania
G	30	Ryan Tankelewicz (W)	5 ft 11 in (1.8 m)	170 lb (77 kg)	So	Raleigh, North Carolina
F	33	Bas Leyte	6 ft 10 in (2.08 m)	220 lb (100 kg)	Fr	Bergen op Zoom, Netherlands
G	44	Kaleb Hunter	6 ft 4 in (1.93 m)	190 lb (86 kg)	RS So	Raleigh, North Carolina

Head coach

- Wes Miller (North Carolina)

Assistant coach(es)

- Chris LePore (Belmont)
- Andre Gray (Methodist)
- Kyle Bankhead (Gonzaga)

Legend

- (C) Team captain
- (S) Suspended
- (I) Ineligible
- (W) Walk-on
- Injured
- Current redshirt

Roster
Last update: December 18, 2019

== Schedule and results ==
Date time, TV	Rank^{#}	Opponent^{#}	Result	Record	High points	High rebounds	High assists	Site (attendance) city, state
Regular season
Nov. 5, 2019*; 7:00 pm, ESPN3		North Carolina A&T; Battle of Market Street	W 83–50	1–0	17 – Hunter	7 – Hunter	6 – Ke. Langley	Greensboro Coliseum (8,131); Greensboro, NC
Nov. 8, 2019*; 8:00 pm, ESPNU		at No. 3 Kansas	L 62–74	1–1	19 – Miller	12 – Hunter	3 – Tied	Allen Fieldhouse (16,300); Lawrence, KS
Nov. 11, 2019*; 7:00 pm, ESPN+		Averett; Spartan Invitational	W 109–51	2–1	24 – Hunter	9 – Dickey	8 – Miller	Greensboro Coliseum (2,553); Greensboro, NC
Nov. 15, 2019*; 7:00 pm		Tennessee Tech; Spartan Invitational	W 64–30	3–1	12 – Dickey	8 – Dickey	4 – Allegri	Fleming Gymnasium (2,112); Greensboro, NC
Nov. 16, 2019*; 6:00 pm		Montana State; Spartan Invitational	L 66–67	3–2	20 – Miller	8 – Dickey	2 – Tied	Fleming Gymnasium (2,066); Greensboro, NC
Nov. 18, 2019*; 7:00 pm		Appalachian State; Spartan Invitational	W 55–41	4–2	14 – Tied	12 – Dickey	2 – Tied	Greensboro Coliseum (3,265); Greensboro, NC
Nov. 24, 2019; 3:00 pm		VMI	W 74–63	5–2 (1–0)	23 – Miller	8 – Miller	4 – Ke. Langley	Greensboro Coliseum (2,744); Greensboro, NC
Nov. 30, 2019*; 2:00 pm, FS2		at Georgetown	W 65–61	6–2	11 – Ke. Langley	8 – Tied	3 – Tied	Capital One Arena (7,302); Washington, DC
Dec. 4, 2019*; 7:00 pm, ESPN+		Kennesaw State	W 72–54	7–2	25 – Miller	8 – Dickey	5 – Miller	Fleming Gymnasium (2,038); Greensboro, NC
Dec. 7, 2019*; 4:00 pm, ESPN+		at Radford	W 60–58	8–2	27 – Miller	8 – Dickey	3 – Miller	Dedmon Center (1,491); Radford, VA
Dec. 15, 2019*; 3:00 pm, ESPN+		NC State	L 77–80	8–3	26 – Miller	10 – Dickey	3 – Tied	Greensboro Coliseum (7,469); Greensboro, NC
Dec. 18, 2019*; 7:00 pm, ESPN+		at Vermont	W 54–53	9–3	11 – Miller	9 – Dickey	3 – Massey	Patrick Gym (2,592); Burlington, VT
Dec. 21, 2019*; 7:00 pm, ESPN+		Northern Kentucky	W 67–50	10–3	12 – Allegri	13 – Dickey	6 – Miller	Fleming Gymnasium (648); Greensboro, NC
Dec. 28, 2019*; 5:00 pm, ESPN3		William Peace	W 106–34	11–3	18 – Miller	9 – Dickey	2 – Tied	Greensboro Coliseum (2,373); Greensboro, NC
Jan. 1, 2020; 7:00 pm, ESPN+		Mercer	W 72–63	12–3 (2–0)	31 – Miller	12 – Dickey	2 – Dickey	Greensboro Coliseum (2,374); Greensboro, NC
Jan. 4, 2020; 7:00 pm, ESPN+		at Wofford	L 92–98 ^{2OT}	12–4 (2–1)	28 – Miller	10 – Abdulsalam	9 – Miller	Jerry Richardson Indoor Stadium (2,226); Spartanburg, SC
Jan. 8, 2020; 7:00 pm, ESPN+		East Tennessee State	L 57–64	12-5 (2–2)	24 – Miller	8 – Dickey	2 – Ke. Langley	Greensboro Coliseum (3,032); Greensboro, NC
Jan. 11, 2020; 7:00 pm, ESPN+		at Furman	W 86–73	13–5 (3–2)	18 – Miller	12 – Dickey	7 – Dickey	Bon Secours Wellness Arena (4,646); Greenville, SC
Jan. 15, 2020; 7:00 pm, ESPN+		at The Citadel	W 79–69	14–5 (4–2)	19 – Dickey	12 – Dickey	3 – Hunter	McAlister Field House (708); Charleston, SC
Jan. 18, 2020; 7:00 pm, ESPN+		Chattanooga	W 72–52	15–5 (5–2)	26 – Miller	12 – Dickey	2 – Tied	Greensboro Coliseum (5,016); Greensboro, NC
Jan. 25, 2020; 3:00 pm, ESPN+		at Samford	W 70–63	16–5 (6–2)	17 – Miller	10 – Miller	5 – Massey	Pete Hanna Center (503); Homewood, AL
Jan. 29, 2020; 7:00 pm, ESPN+		at Western Carolina	W 72–58	17–5 (7–2)	23 – Miller	12 – Dickey	3 – Dickey	Ramsey Center (1,860); Cullowhee, NC
Feb. 1, 2020; 4:00 pm, ESPN+		at East Tennessee State	L 65–82	17–6 (7–3)	18 – Miller	7 – Dickey	4 – Massey	Freedom Hall Civic Center (5,838); Johnson City, TN
Feb. 5, 2020; 7:00 pm, ESPN3		The Citadel	W 88–68	18–6 (8–3)	17 – Ke. Langley	6 – Galloway	6 – Miller	Greensboro Coliseum (3,043); Greensboro, NC
Feb. 9, 2020; 1:00 pm, ESPN+		Samford	W 95–67	19–6 (9–3)	19 – Galloway	16 – Dickey	4 – Tied	Greensboro Coliseum (4,158); Greensboro, NC
Feb. 12, 2020; 7:00 pm, ESPN+		Western Carolina	W 82–62	20–6 (10–3)	20 – Miller	6 – Tied	2 – Tied	Greensboro Coliseum (3,057); Greensboro, NC
Feb. 15, 2020; 7:00 pm, ESPN3		at Mercer	W 67–55	21–6 (11–3)	15 – Tied	20 – Dickey	4 – Massey	Hawkins Arena (2,972); Macon, GA
Feb. 19, 2020; 7:00 pm, ESPN+		Wofford	W 83–79 ^{OT}	22–6 (12–3)	21 – Hunter	11 – Dickey	4 – Dickey	Greensboro Coliseum (3,417); Greensboro, NC
Feb. 22, 2020; 1:00 pm, ESPN3		at VMI	W 71–68	23–6 (13–3)	23 – Miller	12 – Dickey	2 – Tied	Cameron Hall (2,590); Lexington, VA
Feb. 26, 2020; 7:00 pm, ESPN+		Furman	L 67–81	23–7 (13–4)	15 – Dickey	5 – Dickey	7 – Miller	Greensboro Coliseum (4,256); Greensboro, NC
Feb. 29, 2020; 4:30 pm, ESPN+		at Chattanooga	L 72–74	23–8 (13–5)	21 – Hunter	7 – Dickey	7 – Miller	McKenzie Arena (3,565); Chattanooga, TN
SoCon tournament
Mar. 7, 2020; 8:30 pm, ESPN+	(3)	vs. (6) Chattanooga; Quarterfinals	L 68–78	23–9	17 – Miller	11 – Dickey	5 – Miller	Harrah's Cherokee Center (4,194); Asheville, NC
*Non-conference game. ^{#}Rankings from AP Poll. (#) Tournament seedings in parentheses. All times are in Eastern Time.
