= 2020 Southern Conference men's basketball tournament =

- Classification: Division I
- Season: 2019–20
- Teams: 10
- Site: Harrah's Cherokee Center; Asheville, North Carolina
- Champions: East Tennessee State (8th title)
- Winning coach: Steve Forbes (2nd title)
- MVP: Isaiah Tisdale (East Tennessee State)
- Television: ESPN+, ESPN

2019–20 Southern Conference men's basketball standings
	Conf.				Overall
Team	W		L	PCT	W		L	PCT
East Tennessee State †	16	–	2	.889	30	–	4	.882
Furman	15	–	3	.833	25	–	7	.781
UNC Greensboro	13	–	5	.722	23	–	9	.719
Mercer	11	–	7	.611	17	–	15	.531
Western Carolina	10	–	8	.556	19	–	12	.613
Chattanooga	10	–	8	.556	20	–	13	.606
Wofford	8	–	10	.444	19	–	16	.543
Samford	4	–	14	.222	10	–	23	.303
VMI	3	–	15	.167	9	–	24	.273
The Citadel	0	–	18	.000	6	–	24	.200
† 2020 SoCon tournament winner

The 2020 Southern Conference men's basketball tournament was the postseason men's basketball tournament for the Southern Conference for the 2019–20 season. All tournament games were played at the Harrah's Cherokee Center in Asheville, North Carolina, from March 6 through 9, 2020. The winner of the tournament received the conference's automatic bid to the 2020 NCAA Division I men's basketball tournament, which was subsequently cancelled due to the COVID pandemic.

== Seeds ==
All ten teams in the Southern Conference are eligible to compete in the conference tournament. Teams will be seeded by record within the conference, with a tiebreaker system to seed teams with identical conference records. The top six teams received first-round byes.

Seed	School	Conference	Tiebreaker 1
1	East Tennessee State	16–2	
2	Furman	15–3	
3	UNC Greensboro	13–5	
4	Mercer	11–7	
5	Western Carolina	10–8	2–0 vs. Chattanooga
6	Chattanooga	10–8	0–2 vs. Western Carolina
7	Wofford	8–10	
8	Samford	4–14	
9	VMI	3–15	
10	The Citadel	0–18	

== Schedule and results ==
Game	Time	Matchup	Score	Television
First round – Friday, March 6
1	5:00 pm	No. 8 Samford vs. No. 9 VMI	78–96	ESPN+
2	7:30 pm	No. 7 Wofford vs No. 10 The Citadel	93−76	ESPN+
Quarterfinals – Saturday, March 7
3	12:00 pm	No. 1 East Tennessee State vs No. 9 VMI	70–57	ESPN+
4	2:30 pm	No. 4 Mercer vs No. 5 Western Carolina	56–70	ESPN+
5	6:00 pm	No. 2 Furman vs No. 7 Wofford	68–77	ESPN+
6	8:30 pm	No. 3 UNC Greensboro vs No. 6 Chattanooga	68–78	ESPN+
Semifinals – Sunday, March 8
7	4:00 pm	No. 1 East Tennessee State vs No. 5 Western Carolina	97–75	ESPN+
8	6:30 pm	No. 7 Wofford vs No. 6 Chattanooga	72–70	ESPN+
Final – Monday, March 9
9	7:00 pm	No. 1 East Tennessee State vs No. 7 Wofford	72-58	ESPN
*Game times in EST for first round and quarterfinals, and EDT for semifinals and final. Rankings denote tournament seed

== Bracket ==
First round March 6 ESPN+
8	Samford	78
9	VMI	96
7	Wofford	93
10	The Citadel	76

Quarterfinals; March 7 ESPN+
1	ETSU	70
9	VMI	57
4	Mercer	56
5	Western Carolina	70
2	Furman	68
7	Wofford	77
3	UNC Greensboro	68
6	Chattanooga	78

Semifinals; March 8 ESPN+
1	ETSU	97
5	Western Carolina	75
7	Wofford	72
6	Chattanooga	70

Championship; March 9 ESPN
1	ETSU	72
7	Wofford	58

== See also ==
- 2020 Southern Conference women's basketball tournament
