= 2019–20 The Citadel Bulldogs basketball team =

American college basketball season

2019–20 The Citadel Bulldogs basketball
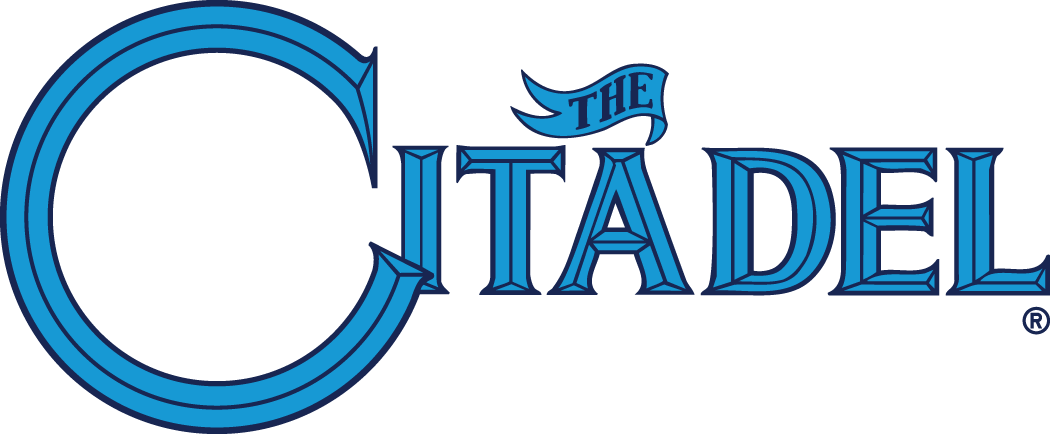
- Conference: Southern Conference
- Record: 6–24 (0–18 SoCon)
- Head coach: Duggar Baucom (5th season)
- Associate head coach: Daniel Willis
- Assistant coaches: Willie Bell; Jack Castleberry
- Home arena: McAlister Field House

2019–20 Southern Conference men's basketball standings
| | Conf. | | | | Overall |
| Team | W | | L | PCT | W | | L | PCT |
|---|---|---|---|---|---|---|---|---|
| East Tennessee State † | 16 | – | 2 | .889 | 30 | – | 4 | .882 |
| Furman | 15 | – | 3 | .833 | 25 | – | 7 | .781 |
| UNC Greensboro | 13 | – | 5 | .722 | 23 | – | 9 | .719 |
| Mercer | 11 | – | 7 | .611 | 17 | – | 15 | .531 |
| Western Carolina | 10 | – | 8 | .556 | 19 | – | 12 | .613 |
| Chattanooga | 10 | – | 8 | .556 | 20 | – | 13 | .606 |
| Wofford | 8 | – | 10 | .444 | 19 | – | 16 | .543 |
| Samford | 4 | – | 14 | .222 | 10 | – | 23 | .303 |
| VMI | 3 | – | 15 | .167 | 9 | – | 24 | .273 |
| The Citadel | 0 | – | 18 | .000 | 6 | – | 24 | .200 |
† 2020 SoCon tournament winner

The 2019–20 The Citadel Bulldogs basketball team represented The Citadel, The Military College of South Carolina in the 2019–20 NCAA Division I men's basketball season. The Bulldogs, led by fifth-year head coach Duggar Baucom, played their home games at McAlister Field House in Charleston, South Carolina, as members of the Southern Conference (SoCon). They finished the season 6–24, 0–18 in SoCon play, to finish in last place. They lost in the first round of the SoCon tournament to Wofford.

== Previous season ==
The Bulldogs finished the 2018–19 season 12–18 overall, 4–14 in SoCon play, to finish in a three-way tie for eighth place. In the SoCon tournament, they were defeated by Samford in the first round.

== Roster ==
2019–20 The Citadel Bulldogs men's basketball team
Players
Coaches

| Pos. | # | Name | Height | Weight | Year | Hometown |
|---|---|---|---|---|---|---|
| F/C | 1 | Stephen Clark | 6 ft 9 in (2.06 m) | 190 lb (86 kg) | Fr | Matthews, NC |
| G | 2 | Jackson Gammons | 6 ft 2 in (1.88 m) | 195 lb (88 kg) | Fr | High Point, NC |
| G | 3 | Rudy III Fitzgibbons | 6 ft 0 in (1.83 m) | 145 lb (66 kg) | Fr | Atlanta, ga |
| G | 4 | Robert Guyton | 5 ft 10 in (1.78 m) | 165 lb (75 kg) | So | Myrtle Beach, SC |
| G | 5 | Fletcher Abee | 6 ft 2 in (1.88 m) | 180 lb (82 kg) | Fr | Morganton, NC |
| G | 11 | Kaiden Rice | 6 ft 6 in (1.98 m) | 185 lb (84 kg) | Jr | Columbia, SC |
| G | 12 | Connor Kern | 6 ft 4 in (1.93 m) | 190 lb (86 kg) | GS | Pickerington, OH |
| G | 13 | Tyson Batiste | 6 ft 3 in (1.91 m) | 200 lb (91 kg) | GS | Springfield, MO |
| F/C | 14 | Brady Spence | 6 ft 9 in (2.06 m) | 200 lb (91 kg) | Fr | Douglasville, GA |
| G | 15 | Jerry III Higgins | 5 ft 10 in (1.78 m) | 175 lb (79 kg) | So | Cleveland, OH |
| F | 20 | Davis Guyton | 6 ft 7 in (2.01 m) | 235 lb (107 kg) | Fr | Myrtle Beach, SC |
| G | 23 | Kaelon Harris | 6 ft 3 in (1.91 m) | 225 lb (102 kg) | Sr | Atlanta, GA |
| F | 25 | Alex Reed | 6 ft 3 in (1.91 m) | 215 lb (98 kg) | Jr | Raleigh, NC |
| F | 31 | Eddie III Davis | 6 ft 7 in (2.01 m) | 255 lb (116 kg) | GS | Las Vegas, NV |
| F | 32 | Derek Jr. Webster | 6 ft 4 in (1.93 m) | 215 lb (98 kg) | Jr | Tampa, FL |
| F | 33 | Hayden Brown | 6 ft 5 in (1.96 m) | 225 lb (102 kg) | Jr | Greer, SC |

Head coach

- Duggar Baucom (UNC Charlotte)

Assistant coach(es)

- Daniel Willis (Lenoir–Rhyne)
- Willie Bell (VMI)
- Jack Castleberry (VMI)

Legend

- (C) Team captain
- (S) Suspended
- (I) Ineligible
- (W) Walk-on
- Injured
- Current redshirt

Roster
Last update: September 27, 2024

== Schedule and results ==
| Date time, TV | Rank^{#} | Opponent^{#} | Result | Record | Site (attendance) city, state |
Regular season
| November 9, 2019*; 12:00 p.m., ESPN3 | | UNC Asheville | L 76–91 | 0–1 | McAlister Field House (742); Charleston, SC |
| November 12, 2019*; 7:00 p.m., SECN+ | | at Georgia | L 86–95 | 0–2 | Stegeman Coliseum (8,058); Athens, GA |
| November 16, 2019*; 1:00 p.m., ESPN3 | | Campbell | L 73–87 | 0–3 | McAlister Field House (633); Charleston, SC |
| November 19, 2019*; 7:30 p.m., ESPN+ | | at Southeast Missouri State | W 74–69 | 1–3 | Show Me Center (1,087); Cape Girardeau, MO |
| November 20, 2019*; 9:00 p.m., BTN | | at Illinois; Illinois Classic | L 57–85 | 1–4 | State Farm Center (11,196); Champaign, IL |
| November 23, 2019*; 7:00 p.m., ESPN+ | | at Marist | W 79–75 | 2–4 | McCann Arena (1,210); Poughkeepsie, NY |
| November 26, 2019*; 7:00 p.m., ESPN+ | | Brevard; Illinois Classic | W 90–47 | 3–4 | McAlister Field House (424); Charleston, SC |
| December 4, 2019; 7:00 p.m., ESPN+ | | East Tennessee State | L 84–96 | 3–5 (0–1) | McAlister Field House (629); Charleston, SC |
| December 7, 2019*; 1:00 p.m., ESPN3 | | Carver | W 108–40 | 4–5 | McAlister Field House (640); Charleston, SC |
| December 10, 2019*; 7:00 p.m., ESPN3 | | Piedmont | W 129–83 | 5–5 | McAlister Field House (451); Charleston, SC |
| December 19, 2019*; 7:00 p.m., ESPN+ | | at Longwood | W 102–99 ^{3OT} | 6–5 | Willett Hall (913); Farmville, VA |
| December 22, 2019*; 6:00 p.m., ACCN | | at NC State | L 63–83 | 6–6 | PNC Arena (15,501); Raleigh, NC |
| January 1, 2020; 3:00 p.m., ESPN+ | | at Samford | L 68–69 | 6–7 (0–2) | Pete Hanna Center (305); Homewood, AL |
| January 4, 2020; 1:00 p.m., ESPN+ | | Western Carolina | L 82-86 | 6–8 (0–3) | McAlister Field House (1,056); Charleston, SC |
| January 11, 2020; 7:00 p.m., ESPN3 | | at Wofford; Rivalry | L 71–73 | 6–9 (0–4) | Jerry Richardson Indoor Stadium (2,153); Spartanburg, SC |
| January 15, 2020; 7:00 p.m., ESPN+ | | UNC Greensboro | L 69–79 | 6–10 (0–5) | McAlister Field House (708); Charleston, SC |
| January 18, 2020; 1:00 p.m., ESPN+ | | at VMI; Rivalry | L 79–88 | 6–11 (0–6) | Cameron Hall (3,000); Lexington, VA |
| January 22, 2020; 7:00 p.m., ESPN+ | | at Chattanooga | L 69–92 | 6–12 (0–7) | McKenzie Arena (2,477); Chattanooga, TN |
| January 25, 2020; 1:00 p.m., ESPN3 | | Furman; Rivalry | L 54–78 | 6–13 (0–8) | McAlister Field House (1,254); Charleston, SC |
| January 29, 2020; 7:00 p.m., ESPN+ | | Wofford; Rivalry | L 59–76 | 6–14 (0–9) | McAlister Field House (1,263); Charleston, SC |
| February 1, 2020; 4:30 p.m., WCBD/ESPN3 | | at Mercer | L 71–76 | 6–15 (0–10) | Hawkins Arena (4,072); Macon, GA |
| February 5, 2020; 7:00 p.m., ESPN3 | | at UNC Greensboro | L 68–88 | 6–16 (0–11) | Greensboro Coliseum (3,043); Greensboro, NC |
| February 8, 2020; 1:00 p.m., ESPN+ | | VMI; Rivalry | L 64–75 | 6–17 (0–12) | McAlister Field House (3,652); Charleston, SC |
| February 12, 2020; 7:00 p.m., ESPN+ | | at East Tennessee State | L 67–91 | 6–18 (0–13) | Freedom Hall Civic Center (4,573); Johnson City, TN |
| February 15, 2020; 1:00 p.m., WCBD/ESPN3 | | Samford | L 62–74 | 6–19 (0–14) | McAlister Field House (833); Charleston, SC |
| February 19, 2020; 7:00 p.m., ESPN+ | | Chattanooga | L 68–91 | 6–20 (0–15) | McAlister Field House (622); Charleston, SC |
| February 22, 2020; 7:30 p.m., ESPN3 | | at Western Carolina | L 84–96 | 6–21 (0–16) | Ramsey Center (3,497); Cullowhee, NC |
| February 26, 2020; 7:00 p.m., ESPN3 | | Mercer | L 57–73 | 6–22 (0–17) | McAlister Field House (1,112); Charleston, SC |
| February 29, 2020; 4:00 p.m., WCBD/ESPN3 | | at Furman; Rivalry | L 58–82 | 6–23 (0–18) | Timmons Arena (2,500); Greenville, SC |
SoCon tournament
| March 6, 2020; 7:30 p.m., ESPN+ | (10) | vs. (7) Wofford; First round | L 76–93 | 6–24 | Harrah's Cherokee Center (2,338); Asheville, NC |
*Non-conference game. ^{#}Rankings from AP poll. (#) Tournament seedings in parentheses. All times are in Eastern.
