= 2019–20 East Tennessee State Buccaneers men's basketball team =

American college basketball season

2019–20 East Tennessee State Buccaneers men's basketball
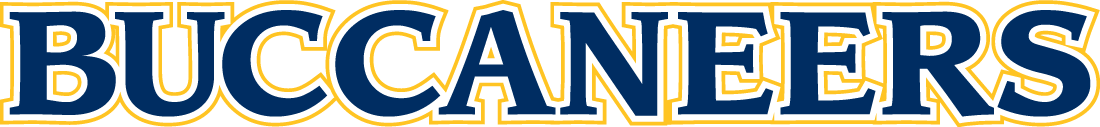

Southern Conference regular season and tournament champions
- Conference: Southern Conference
- Record: 30–4 (16–2 SoCon)
- Head coach: Steve Forbes (5th season)
- Assistant coaches: Jason Shay; Brooks Savage; BJ McKie
- Home arena: Freedom Hall Civic Center

2019–20 Southern Conference men's basketball standings
| | Conf. | | | | Overall |
| Team | W | | L | PCT | W | | L | PCT |
|---|---|---|---|---|---|---|---|---|
| East Tennessee State † | 16 | – | 2 | .889 | 30 | – | 4 | .882 |
| Furman | 15 | – | 3 | .833 | 25 | – | 7 | .781 |
| UNC Greensboro | 13 | – | 5 | .722 | 23 | – | 9 | .719 |
| Mercer | 11 | – | 7 | .611 | 17 | – | 15 | .531 |
| Western Carolina | 10 | – | 8 | .556 | 19 | – | 12 | .613 |
| Chattanooga | 10 | – | 8 | .556 | 20 | – | 13 | .606 |
| Wofford | 8 | – | 10 | .444 | 19 | – | 16 | .543 |
| Samford | 4 | – | 14 | .222 | 10 | – | 23 | .303 |
| VMI | 3 | – | 15 | .167 | 9 | – | 24 | .273 |
| The Citadel | 0 | – | 18 | .000 | 6 | – | 24 | .200 |
† 2020 SoCon tournament winner

The 2019–20 East Tennessee State Buccaneers men's basketball team represented East Tennessee State University in the 2019–20 NCAA Division I men's basketball season. The Buccaneers, led by fifth-year head coach Steve Forbes, played their home games at the Freedom Hall Civic Center in Johnson City, Tennessee, as members of the Southern Conference. They finished the season 30–4, 16–2 in SoCon play to finish as the SoCon regular season champions. They defeated VMI, Western Carolina and Wofford to become champions of the SoCon tournament. They earned the SoCon's automatic bid to the NCAA tournament. However, the NCAA Tournament was cancelled amid the COVID-19 pandemic.

On April 30, 2020, head coach Steve Forbes resigned to become the head coach at Wake Forest. He finished at ETSU with a five-year record of 130–43.

== Previous season ==
The Buccaneers finished the 2018–19 season 24–10 overall, 13–5 in SoCon play to finish in a tie for third place. In the SoCon tournament, they defeated Chattanooga in the quarterfinals, before losing to Wofford in the semifinals. They received an invitation to the CIT, where they lost to Green Bay in the first round.

== Roster ==
2019–20 East Tennessee State Buccaneers men's basketball team
Players
Coaches

| Pos. | # | Name | Height | Weight | Year | Hometown |
|---|---|---|---|---|---|---|
| G | 1 | Tray Boyd III | 6 ft 4 in (1.93 m) | 195 lb (88 kg) | Sr | Memphis, Tennessee |
| G | 3 | Bo Hodges | 6 ft 5 in (1.96 m) | 210 lb (95 kg) | Jr | Nashville, Tennessee |
| G | 5 | Daivien Williamson | 6 ft 2 in (1.88 m) | 165 lb (75 kg) | So | Winston-Salem, North Carolina |
| G | 10 | Patrick Good | 6 ft 0 in (1.83 m) | 175 lb (79 kg) | RS Jr | Johnson City, Tennessee |
| F | 11 | Jeromy Rodriguez | 6 ft 7 in (2.01 m) | 230 lb (104 kg) | RS Sr | Santiago, Dominican Republic |
| F | 12 | Damari Monsanto | 6 ft 6 in (1.98 m) | 225 lb (102 kg) | Fr | Pembroke Pines, Florida |
| C | 13 | Octavion Corley | 7 ft 0 in (2.13 m) | 210 lb (95 kg) | RS Jr | Reno, Nevada |
| G | 15 | Isaiah Tisdale | 6 ft 1 in (1.85 m) | 195 lb (88 kg) | Sr | Lexington, Kentucky |
| F | 21 | Joe Hugley | 6 ft 7 in (2.01 m) | 235 lb (107 kg) | Sr | Gaithersburg, Maryland |
| F | 23 | Vonnie Patterson | 6 ft 4 in (1.93 m) | 200 lb (91 kg) | Jr | Louisville, Kentucky |
| G | 24 | Jordan Coffin | 6 ft 1 in (1.85 m) | 185 lb (84 kg) | Jr | Knoxville, Tennessee |
| C | 25 | Lucas N'Guessan | 7 ft 0 in (2.13 m) | 230 lb (104 kg) | Sr | De Lier, Netherlands |
| F | 33 | Charlie Weber | 6 ft 9 in (2.06 m) | 215 lb (98 kg) | Fr | Owings, Maryland |
| G | | Ledarrius Brewer | 6 ft 5 in (1.96 m) | 195 lb (88 kg) | Jr | Meridian, Mississippi |

Head coach

- Steve Forbes (Southern Arkansas)

Assistant coach(es)

- Jason Shay (Western Illinois)
- Brooks Savage (Tennessee)
- BJ McKie (South Carolina)

Legend

- (C) Team captain
- (S) Suspended
- (I) Ineligible
- (W) Walk-on
- Injured
- Current redshirt

Roster
Last update: November 28, 2019

== Schedule and results ==
| Date time, TV | Rank^{#} | Opponent^{#} | Result | Record | Site (attendance) city, state |
Exhibition
| November 1, 2019*; 7:00 pm | | Limestone | W 80–62 | | Freedom Hall Civic Center (3,205); Johnson City, TN |
Regular season
| November 6, 2019*; 7:00 pm, ESPN+ | | Newberry | W 79–50 | 1–0 | Freedom Hall Civic Center (3,323); Johnson City, TN |
| November 9, 2019*; 8:00 pm, ESPN+ | | at UT Martin | W 92–75 | 2–0 | Skyhawk Arena (1,386); Martin, TN |
| November 14, 2019*; 7:00 pm, ESPN+ | | Winthrop | W 61–58 | 3–0 | Freedom Hall Civic Center (4,118); Johnson City, TN |
| November 19, 2019*; 8:00 pm, ESPN+ | | at No. 4 Kansas; Maui Invitational Mainland | L 63–75 | 3–1 | Allen Fieldhouse (16,300); Lawrence, KS |
| November 23, 2019*; 2:00 pm, ESPN3 | | Delaware State; Maui Invitational Mainland | W 98–66 | 4–1 | Freedom Hall Civic Center (4,004); Johnson City, TN |
| November 24, 2019*; 2:00 pm, ESPN+ | | Southern Utah; Maui Invitational Mainland | W 70–58 | 5–1 | Freedom Hall Civic Center (4,053); Johnson City, TN |
| November 26, 2019*; 7:00 pm, ESPN+ | | Appalachian State | W 78–69 | 6–1 | Freedom Hall Civic Center (5,126); Johnson City, TN |
| November 30, 2019*; 3:00 pm, ESPN+ | | at Little Rock | W 67–63 | 7–1 | Jack Stephens Center (921); Little Rock, AR |
| December 4, 2019; 7:00 pm, ESPN+ | | at The Citadel | W 96–84 | 8–1 (1–0) | McAlister Field House (629); Charleston, SC |
| December 7, 2019*; 8:00 pm, ESPN+ | | at North Dakota State | L 68–78 | 8–2 | Scheels Center (2,658); Fargo, ND |
| December 15, 2019*; 2:00 pm, ESPN3 | | Milligan | W 97–41 | 9–2 | Freedom Hall Civic Center (3,927); Johnson City, TN |
| December 18, 2019*; 7:00 pm, SECN | | at LSU | W 74–63 | 10–2 | Pete Maravich Assembly Center (8,556); Baton Rouge, LA |
| December 21, 2019*; 4:00 pm, ESPN3 | | Cleveland State | W 80–55 | 11–2 | Freedom Hall Civic Center (3,852); Johnson City, TN |
| December 29, 2019*; 2:00 pm, ESPN3 | | Mars Hill | W 117–48 | 12–2 | Freedom Hall Civic Center (3,934); Johnson City, TN |
| January 1, 2020; 4:00 pm, ESPN+ | | Wofford | W 49–48 | 13–2 (2–0) | Freedom Hall Civic Center (5,274); Johnson City, TN |
| January 4, 2020; 4:00 pm, ESPN3 | | at Furman | L 56–65 | 13–3 (2–1) | Timmons Arena (2,314); Greenville, SC |
| January 8, 2020; 7:00 pm, ESPN+ | | at UNC Greensboro | W 64–57 | 14–3 (3–1) | Greensboro Coliseum (3,032); Greensboro, NC |
| January 11, 2020; 4:00 pm, ESPN3 | | VMI | W 61–55 | 15–3 (4–1) | Freedom Hall Civic Center (4,730); Johnson City, TN |
| January 15, 2020; 7:00 pm, ESPN+ | | Samford | W 88–63 | 16–3 (5–1) | Freedom Hall Civic Center (4,204); Johnson City, TN |
| January 18, 2020; 7:00 pm, ESPN+ | | at Western Carolina | W 85–66 | 17–3 (6–1) | Ramsey Center (3,756); Cullowhee, NC |
| January 25, 2020; 4:00 pm, ESPN+ | | Chattanooga | W 75–64 | 18–3 (7–1) | Freedom Hall Civic Center (6,086); Johnson City, TN |
| January 29, 2020; 7:00 pm, ESPN+ | | Mercer | L 55–71 | 18–4 (7–2) | Freedom Hall Civic Center (4,608); Johnson City, TN |
| February 1, 2020; 4:00 pm, ESPN+ | | UNC Greensboro | W 82–65 | 19–4 (8–2) | Freedom Hall Civic Center (5,838); Johnson City, TN |
| February 5, 2020; 7:00 pm, ESPN+ | | at Chattanooga | W 80–64 | 20–4 (9–2) | McKenzie Arena (2,823); Chattanooga, TN |
| February 8, 2020; 4:30 pm, ESPN+ | | at Mercer | W 73–60 | 21–4 (10–2) | Hawkins Arena (3,472); Macon, GA |
| February 12, 2020; 7:00 pm, ESPN+ | | The Citadel | W 91–67 | 22–4 (11–2) | Freedom Hall Civic Center (4,573); Johnson City, TN |
| February 15, 2020; 1:00 pm, ESPN3 | | at VMI | W 72–67 | 23–4 (12–2) | Cameron Hall (2,100); Lexington, VA |
| February 19, 2020; 7:00 pm, ESPN+ | | Furman | W 75–66 | 24–4 (13–2) | Freedom Hall Civic Center (6,177); Johnson City, TN |
| February 22, 2020; 3:00 pm, ESPN3 | | at Samford | W 80–74 | 25–4 (14–2) | Pete Hanna Center (511); Homewood, AL |
| February 26, 2020; 7:00 pm, ESPN+ | | at Wofford | W 60–54 | 26–4 (15–2) | Jerry Richardson Indoor Stadium (2,345); Spartanburg, SC |
| February 29, 2020; 4:00 pm, ESPN3 | | Western Carolina | W 68–67 | 27–4 (16–2) | Freedom Hall Civic Center (6,177); Johnson City, TN |
SoCon tournament
| March 7, 2020; 12:00 pm, ESPN+ | (1) | vs. (9) VMI; Quarterfinals | W 70–57 | 28–4 | Harrah's Cherokee Center (5,573); Asheville, NC |
| March 8, 2020; 4:00 pm, ESPN+ | (1) | vs. (5) Western Carolina; Semifinals | W 97–75 | 29–4 | Harrah's Cherokee Center (6,132); Asheville, NC |
| March 9, 2020; 7:00 pm, ESPN | (1) | vs. (7) Wofford; Championship | W 72–58 | 30–4 | Harrah's Cherokee Center (6,400); Asheville, NC |
NCAA tournament
| | | | Cancelled due to the COVID-19 pandemic | | |
*Non-conference game. ^{#}Rankings from AP Poll. (#) Tournament seedings in parentheses. All times are in Eastern.
