= Greg Gary (basketball) =

American basketball player and coach (born 1970)

Current position
- Title: Interim head coach
- Team: Georgia Tech
- Conference: ACC

Biographical details
- Born: February 14, 1970 (age 56); Anderson, Indiana, U.S.

Playing career
- 1989–1992: Tulane
- Position: Point guard

Coaching career (HC unless noted)
- 1993–1997: Tulane (assistant)
- 1997–1998: McNeese State (assistant)
- 1998–2000: Tulane (assistant)
- 2000–2004: Miami (FL) (assistant)
- 2004–2007: South Florida (assistant)
- 2007–2008: Duquesne (assistant)
- 2008–2010: Centenary
- 2010–2011: Duquesne (assistant)
- 2011–2019: Purdue (assistant)
- 2019–2024: Mercer
- 2024–2026: Georgia Tech (QCA)
- 2026–present: Georgia Tech (interim HC)

Head coaching record
- Overall: 97–123 (.441)

Greg Gary (born February 14, 1970) is an American head college basketball coach who is currently the interim head coach for the Georgia Tech Yellow Jackets. He was most recently the head coach for the Mercer Bears men's basketball team. He is the former head men's basketball coach at Centenary College of Louisiana. He replaced Rob Flaska. He was born in Anderson, Indiana.

Gary graduated from Highland High School, Anderson, IN, in 1988 and went on to play college basketball at Tulane University from 1989 to 1992 after spending one year at Aquinas College. He helped lead Tulane to an NCAA Tournament appearance in 1992 and graduated as the school's all-time assist leader.

In May 2011, Gary returned to Indiana as an assistant coach at Purdue University in West Lafayette. He was hired as the head basketball coach at Mercer University on March 26, 2019.

== Head coaching record ==
Record table
Season	Team	Overall	Conference	Standing	Postseason
Centenary Gentlemen (Summit) (2008–2010)
2008–09	Centenary	8–23	6–12	T–8th	
2009–10	Centenary	8–21	3–15	T–9th	
Centenary:		16–44 (.267)	9–27 (.250)		
Mercer Bears (SoCon) (2019–2024)
2019–20	Mercer	17–15	11–7	4th	
2020–21	Mercer	18–11	8–9	7th	
2021–22	Mercer	16–17	8–10	7th	
2022–23	Mercer	14–19	6–12	8th	
2023–24	Mercer	16–17	8–10	T–7th	
Mercer:		81–79 (.506)	41–48 (.461)		
Total:		97–123 (.441)			
National champion Postseason invitational champion Conference regular season champion Conference regular season and conference tournament champion Division regular season champion Division regular season and conference tournament champion Conference tournament champion
