= 2019–20 VMI Keydets basketball team =

American college basketball season

2019–20 VMI Keydets basketball
- Conference: Southern Conference
- Record: 9–24 (3–15 SoCon)
- Head coach: Dan Earl (5th season)
- Assistant coaches: Austin Kenon (3rd season); Ander Galfsky (1st season); Logan Dahms (1st season)
- Home arena: Cameron Hall

2019–20 Southern Conference men's basketball standings
	Conf.				Overall
Team	W		L	PCT	W		L	PCT
East Tennessee State †	16	–	2	.889	30	–	4	.882
Furman	15	–	3	.833	25	–	7	.781
UNC Greensboro	13	–	5	.722	23	–	9	.719
Mercer	11	–	7	.611	17	–	15	.531
Western Carolina	10	–	8	.556	19	–	12	.613
Chattanooga	10	–	8	.556	20	–	13	.606
Wofford	8	–	10	.444	19	–	16	.543
Samford	4	–	14	.222	10	–	23	.303
VMI	3	–	15	.167	9	–	24	.273
The Citadel	0	–	18	.000	6	–	24	.200
† 2020 SoCon tournament winner

The 2019–20 VMI Keydets basketball team represented the Virginia Military Institute during the 2019–20 NCAA Division I men's basketball season. The Keydets were led by fifth-year head coach Dan Earl and played their home games in Cameron Hall in Lexington, Virginia, their home since 1981, as members of the Southern Conference. They finished the season 9–24, 3–15 in SoCon play to finish in ninth place. They defeated Samford in the first round of the SoCon tournament before losing to East Tennessee State in the quarterfinals.

== Previous season ==
The Keydets finished the 2018–19 campaign with a 11–21, 4–14 in SoCon play to finish in eighth place. They lost in the quarterfinals of the SoCon tournament to Wofford. It was the first year in five years the Keydets won a SoCon Tournament game.

== Roster ==
2019–20 VMI Keydets men's basketball team
Players
Coaches

Pos.	#	Name	Height	Weight	Year	Hometown
G	0	Louis Tang	6 ft 4 in (1.93 m)	185 lb (84 kg)	Fr	Kaohsiung, Taiwan
F	1	Tragen Fahl	6 ft 8 in (2.03 m)	200 lb (91 kg)	Jr	Virginia Beach, Virginia
G	2	Garrett Gilkeson	6 ft 4 in (1.93 m)	215 lb (98 kg)	Sr	Parkersburg, West Virginia
G	3	Travis Evee	6 ft 0 in (1.83 m)	165 lb (75 kg)	Fr	Randolph, Massachusetts
G	5	Greg Parham	6 ft 4 in (1.93 m)	175 lb (79 kg)	Jr	Richmond, Virginia
G	10	Kamdyn Curfman	6 ft 0 in (1.83 m)	170 lb (77 kg)	Fr	North Bethesda, Maryland
G	12	Ta'Vonne Bond	6 ft 0 in (1.83 m)	178 lb (81 kg)	Jr	Columbia, South Carolina
F	14	Sam Wolfe	6 ft 8 in (2.03 m)	210 lb (95 kg)	Fr	Charlotte, North Carolina
G	15	Myles Lewis	6 ft 5 in (1.96 m)	189 lb (86 kg)	Jr	Ashburn, Virginia
F	21	Connor Arnold	6 ft 7 in (2.01 m)	213 lb (97 kg)	So	Knoxville, Tennessee
G	22	Jordan Richeson	6 ft 4 in (1.93 m)	187 lb (85 kg)	Fr	Alleghany, Virginia
F	24	Will Miller	6 ft 8 in (2.03 m)	220 lb (100 kg)	Sr	South Boston, Virginia
C	25	Tyler Creammer	6 ft 10 in (2.08 m)	260 lb (118 kg)	Sr	Parkton, North Carolina
G	30	Sean Conway	6 ft 4 in (1.93 m)	200 lb (91 kg)	Fr	Fairfield, Connecticut
C	34	Jake Stephens	6 ft 9 in (2.06 m)	254 lb (115 kg)	So	Bunker Hill, West Virginia

Head coach

- Dan Earl (Penn State '97)

Assistant coach(es)

- Austin Kenon (VMI '11)
- Ander Galfsky (Birmingham–Southern '15)
- Logan Dahms (Texas A&M '13)

Legend

- (C) Team captain
- (S) Suspended
- (I) Ineligible
- (W) Walk-on
- Injured
- Current redshirt

Roster
Last update: January 4, 2020

== Schedule and results ==
Date time, TV	Rank^{#}	Opponent^{#}	Result	Record	High points	High rebounds	High assists	Site (attendance) city, state
Regular season
November 5, 2019*; 7:00 pm		at East Carolina	L 68–80	0–1	23 – Parham	8 – Gilkeson	3 – Parham	Minges Coliseum (4,027); Greenville, NC
November 8, 2019*; 7:00 pm		Marist	L 56–58	0–2	12 – Stephens	8 – Stephens	4 – Gilkeson	Cameron Hall (1,246); Lexington, VA
November 11, 2019*; 7:00 pm		Presbyterian	L 77–80 ^{OT}	0–3	20 – Evee	10 – Stephens	6 – Gilkeson	Cameron Hall (985); Lexington, VA
November 14, 2019*; 8:30 pm, ESPN+		at Arkansas State; Red Wolves Classic	L 56–71	0–4	11 – Lewis	7 – Gilkeson	3 – Evee	First National Bank Arena (1,104); Jonesboro, AR
November 15, 2019*; 1:30 pm		vs. Idaho; Red Wolves Classic	L 67–68	0–5	20 – Curfman	6 – Curfman	4 – Curfman	First National Bank Arena (101); Jonesboro, AR
November 17, 2019*; 12:00 pm		vs. UC Davis; Red Wolves Classic	W 89–84 ^{2OT}	1–5	18 – Gilkeson	17 – Creammer	7 – Gilkeson	First National Bank Arena (103); Jonesboro, AR
November 20, 2019*; 7:00 pm, ESPN3		Christendom	W 96–20	2–5	18 – Conway	7 – Conway	6 – Evee	Cameron Hall (1,124); Lexington, VA
November 24, 2019; 3:00 pm, ESPN+		at UNC Greensboro	L 63–74	2–6 (0–1)	21 – Gilkeson	6 – Gilkeson	4 – Parham	Greensboro Coliseum (2,744); Greensboro, NC
November 26, 2019*; 7:00 pm, ESPN3		Goucher	W 98–32	3–6	18 – Parham	9 – Tang	4 – Gilkeson	Cameron Hall (588); Lexington, VA
December 4, 2019*; 7:00 pm, ESPN+		at Duquesne	L 58–71	3–7	26 – Evee	9 – Creammer	3 – Gilkeson	Kerr Fitness Center (1,204); McCandless, PA
December 7, 2019*; 1:00 pm, ESPN+		Stetson	W 88–61	4–7	18 – Evee	5 – Creammer	6 – Gilkeson	Cameron Hall (2,412); Lexington, VA
December 11, 2019*; 7:00 pm, ESPN3		Ferrum	W 78–60	5–7	17 – Evee	7 – Creammer	3 – Evee	Cameron Hall (1,038); Lexington, VA
December 21, 2019*; 4:00 pm, ACCN		at Virginia Tech; Rivalry	L 55–64	5–8	20 – Evee	8 – Creammer	4 – Creammer	Cassell Coliseum (7,446); Blacksburg, VA
December 29, 2019*; 2:00 pm, ESPN+		at USC Upstate	L 82–91	5–9	25 – Evee	9 – Gilkeson	5 – Evee	Hodge Center (459); Spartanburg, SC
January 1, 2020; 1:00 pm, ESPN+		Furman	L 73–89	5–10 (0–2)	15 – Conway	8 – Stephens	3 – Tang	Cameron Hall (950); Lexington, VA
January 4, 2020; 1:00 pm, ESPN+		Samford	W 78–75	5–11 (0–3)	24 – Evee	10 – Gilkeson	5 – Evee	Cameron Hall (786); Lexington, VA
January 8, 2020; 7:00 pm, ESPN3		Western Carolina	L 85–97	5–12 (0–4)	18 – Gilkeson	10 – Creammer	6 – Gilkeson	Cameron Hall (645); Lexington, VA
January 11, 2020; 4:00 pm, ESPN3		at East Tennessee State	L 55–61	5–13 (0–5)	13 – Evee	10 – Gilkeson	3 – Tied	Freedom Hall Civic Center (4,730); Johnson City, TN
January 15, 2020; 7:00 pm, ESPN+		at Mercer	L 62–73	5–14 (0–6)	17 – Evee	5 – Tied	4 – Gilkeson	Hawkins Arena (2,457); Macon, GA
January 18, 2020; 1:00 pm, ESPN+		The Citadel; Rivalry	W 88–79	6–14 (1–6)	18 – Stephens	11 – Steppens	9 – Parham	Cameron Hall (3,000); Lexington, VA
January 22, 2020; 7:00 pm, ESPN+		at Wofford	L 54–66	6–15 (1–7)	16 – Parham	6 – Curfman	2 – Tied	Jerry Richardson Indoor Stadium (1,487); Spartanburg, SC
January 25, 2020; 1:00 pm, ESPN3		at Mercer	L 66–69	6–16 (1–8)	14 – Lewis	9 – Tied	4 – Tied	Cameron Hall (2,400); Lexington, VA
January 29, 2020; 7:00 pm, ESPN+		at Furman	L 72–74 ^{OT}	6–17 (1–9)	19 – Parham	5 – 4 tied	3 – Gilkeson	Timmons Arena (1,512); Greenville, SC
February 5, 2020; 7:00 pm, ESPN+		Wofford	L 73–79	6–18 (1–10)	28 – Gilkeson	9 – Gilkeson	5 – Parham	Cameron Hall (1,500); Lexington, VA
February 8, 2020; 7:00 pm, ESPN+		at The Citadel; Rivalry	W 75–64	7–18 (2–10)	36 – Parham	8 – Stephens	5 – Parham	McAlister Field House (3,652); Charleston, SC
February 12, 2020; 7:00 pm, ESPN+		at Chattanooga	L 67–86	7–19 (2–11)	13 – Curfman	5 – Gilkeson	4 – Stephens	McKenzie Arena (2,605); Chattanooga, TN
February 15, 2020; 1:00 pm, ESPN+		East Tennessee State	L 67–72	7–20 (2–12)	23 – Evee	10 – Conway	3 – Tied	Cameron Hall (2,100); Lexington, VA
February 19, 2020; 7:00 pm, ESPN+		at Western Carolina	W 74–71	8–20 (3–12)	25 – Evee	8 – Stepehns	4 – Tied	Ramsey Center (1,528); Cullowhee, NC
February 22, 2020; 1:00 pm, ESPN+		UNC Greensboro	L 68–71	8–21 (3–13)	16 – Evee	6 – Creammer	5 – Gilkeson	Cameron Hall (2,590); Lexington, VA
February 26, 2020; 7:00 pm, ESPN+		Chattanooga	L 64–71	8–22 (3–14)	15 – Conway	6 – Tang	5 – Evee	Cameron Hall (900); Lexington, VA
February 29, 2020; 7:00 pm, ESPN+		at Samford	L 78–84	8–23 (3–15)	16 – Curfman	8 – Parham	6 – Stephens	Pete Hanna Center (521); Homewood, AL
SoCon tournament
March 6, 2020; 5:00 pm, ESPN+	(9)	vs. (8) Samford; First round	W 96–78	9–23	24 – Stephens	8 – Stepehns	7 – Gilkeson	Harrah's Cherokee Center (2,338); Asheville, NC
March 7, 2020; 12:00 pm, ESPN+	(9)	vs. (1) East Tennessee State; Quarterfinals	L 57–70	9–24	11 – Conway	9 – Conway	4 – Parham	Harrah's Cherokee Center (5,573); Asheville, NC
*Non-conference game. ^{#}Rankings from AP Poll. (#) Tournament seedings in parentheses. All times are in Eastern.
