= 2019–20 Samford Bulldogs men's basketball team =

American college basketball season

2019–20 Samford Bulldogs men's basketball
- Conference: Southern Conference
- Record: 10–23 (4–14 SoCon)
- Head coach: Scott Padgett (6th season)
- Associate head coach: Shawn Finney
- Assistant coaches: Sidney Ball; Charles Newton
- Home arena: Pete Hanna Center

2019–20 Southern Conference men's basketball standings
| | Conf. | | | | Overall |
| Team | W | | L | PCT | W | | L | PCT |
|---|---|---|---|---|---|---|---|---|
| East Tennessee State † | 16 | – | 2 | .889 | 30 | – | 4 | .882 |
| Furman | 15 | – | 3 | .833 | 25 | – | 7 | .781 |
| UNC Greensboro | 13 | – | 5 | .722 | 23 | – | 9 | .719 |
| Mercer | 11 | – | 7 | .611 | 17 | – | 15 | .531 |
| Western Carolina | 10 | – | 8 | .556 | 19 | – | 12 | .613 |
| Chattanooga | 10 | – | 8 | .556 | 20 | – | 13 | .606 |
| Wofford | 8 | – | 10 | .444 | 19 | – | 16 | .543 |
| Samford | 4 | – | 14 | .222 | 10 | – | 23 | .303 |
| VMI | 3 | – | 15 | .167 | 9 | – | 24 | .273 |
| The Citadel | 0 | – | 18 | .000 | 6 | – | 24 | .200 |
† 2020 SoCon tournament winner

The 2019–20 Samford Bulldogs men's basketball team represented Samford University in the 2019–20 NCAA Division I men's basketball season. The Bulldogs, led by sixth-year head coach Scott Padgett, played their home games at the Pete Hanna Center in Homewood, Alabama as members of the Southern Conference. They finished the season 10–23, 4–14 in SoCon play to finish in eighth place. They lost in the first round of the SoCon tournament to VMI.

On March 16, 2020, the school announced that head coach Scott Padgett had been fired. On April 6, the school announced it had hired high school coach Bucky McMillan as the Bulldogs' new head coach.

== Previous season ==
The Bulldogs finished the 2018–19 season 17–16 overall, 6–12 in SoCon play to finish in a tie for 6th place. In the SoCon tournament, they defeated The Citadel in the first round, before losing to UNC Greensboro in the quarterfinals.

== Roster ==
2019–20 Samford Bulldogs men's basketball team
Players
Coaches

| Pos. | # | Name | Height | Weight | Year | Hometown |
|---|---|---|---|---|---|---|
| G | 0 | Brandon Austin | 6 ft 5 in (1.96 m) | 200 lb (91 kg) | RS Sr | Montgomery, Alabama |
| G | 1 | J.P. Robinson | 5 ft 10 in (1.78 m) | — | Fr | Tuscumbia, Alabama |
| G | 2 | K.J. Davis | 6 ft 6 in (1.98 m) | 185 lb (84 kg) | RS So | Portsmouth, Virginia |
| G | 3 | Josh Sharkey | 5 ft 10 in (1.78 m) | 170 lb (77 kg) | Sr | Philadelphia, Pennsylvania |
| G | 4 | Myron Gordon | 6 ft 3 in (1.91 m) | 180 lb (82 kg) | RS Jr | Bordentown, New Jersey |
| G | 5 | Deandre Thomas | 6 ft 4 in (1.93 m) | 190 lb (86 kg) | So | Richmond, Virginia |
| G | 10 | Preston Parks | 6 ft 1 in (1.85 m) | 175 lb (79 kg) | Sr | Greenville, South Carolina |
| G | 11 | Jack Dorough (W) | 5 ft 10 in (1.78 m) | 155 lb (70 kg) | Fr | Homewood, Alabama |
| G | 13 | Kwon Bush (W) | 5 ft 8 in (1.73 m) | 140 lb (64 kg) | Fr | Fayetteville, Georgia |
| G | 14 | Paul Kelley (W) | 6 ft 2 in (1.88 m) | 165 lb (75 kg) | Fr | Macon, Georgia |
| F | 21 | Robert Allen | 6 ft 8 in (2.03 m) | 200 lb (91 kg) | So | Orlando, Florida |
| F | 22 | Logan Dye | 6 ft 8 in (2.03 m) | 235 lb (107 kg) | So | Haleyville, Alabama |
| G | 23 | Donte Tatum | 6 ft 1 in (1.85 m) | 183 lb (83 kg) | Jr | Cary, North Carolina |
| F | 24 | Jalen Dupree | 6 ft 8 in (2.03 m) | 235 lb (107 kg) | Sr | Cordova, Tennessee |
| G | 30 | D'Marcus Purcell (W) | 6 ft 2 in (1.88 m) | 175 lb (79 kg) | Fr | Crestview, Florida |
| F | 31 | Bryan Smith (W) | 6 ft 4 in (1.93 m) | 180 lb (82 kg) | Fr | Pismo Beach, California |
| F | 34 | Logan Padgett | 6 ft 6 in (1.98 m) | 205 lb (93 kg) | Fr | Homewood, Alabama |
| F | 35 | Stanley Henderson, Jr. | 6 ft 6 in (1.98 m) | 210 lb (95 kg) | So | Jonesboro, Georgia |

Head coach

- Scott Padgett (Kentucky)

Assistant coach(es)

- Shawn Finney (Fairmont State)
- Sidney Ball (UAB)
- Charles Newton (Tennessee Tech)

Legend

- (C) Team captain
- (S) Suspended
- (I) Ineligible
- (W) Walk-on
- Injured
- Current redshirt

Roster
Last update: November 29, 2019

== Schedule and results ==
| Date time, TV | Rank^{#} | Opponent^{#} | Result | Record | Site (attendance) city, state |
Non-conference regular season
| November 5, 2019*; 6:00 pm, ESPN+ | | at Morehead State | L 86–90 ^{2OT} | 0–1 | Ellis Johnson Arena (2,043); Morehead, KY |
| November 7, 2019*; 6:30 pm, ESPN+ | | Kentucky Wesleyan | W 68–42 | 1–1 | Pete Hanna Center (1,018); Homewood, AL |
| November 11, 2019*; 6:30 pm, ESPN+ | | at Belmont | L 63–95 | 1–2 | Curb Event Center (2,638); Nashville, TN |
| November 13, 2019*; 6:30 pm, ESPN3 | | UVA–Wise | W 102–64 | 2–2 | Pete Hanna Center (504); Homewood, AL |
| November 16, 2019*; 6:30 pm, ESPN+ | | at North Alabama | L 55–61 | 2–3 | Flowers Hall (1,016); Florence, AL |
| November 19, 2019*; 6:30 pm, ESPN+ | | Manhattan | W 70–57 | 3–3 | Pete Hanna Center (470); Homewood, AL |
| November 23, 2019*; 2:00 pm, ESPN3 | | Troy | W 72–60 | 4–3 | Pete Hanna Center (553); Homewood, AL |
| November 27, 2019*; 7:00 pm, ESPN3 | | at South Dakota State | L 77–86 | 4–4 | Frost Arena (1,307); Brookings, SD |
| November 30, 2019*; 8:00 pm, CUSA.tv | | at Louisiana Tech | L 57–78 | 4–5 | Thomas Assembly Center (2,033); Ruston, LA |
| December 3, 2019*; 6:30 pm, ESPN3 | | Auburn Montgomery | W 97–64 | 5–5 | Pete Hanna Center (425); Homewood, AL |
| December 7, 2019*; 7:00 pm | | at Houston Baptist | W 113–90 | 6–5 | Sharp Gymnasium (605); Houston, TX |
| December 15, 2019*; 8:30 pm, Spectrum Sports | | at Hawaii | L 73–94 | 6–6 | Stan Sheriff Center (5,014); Honolulu, HI |
| December 18, 2019*; 6:30 pm, ESPN+ | | vs. Alabama; Birmingham Classic | L 87–105 | 6–7 | Legacy Arena (5,476); Birmingham, AL |
| December 21, 2019*; 11:00 am, FS1 | | at Georgetown | L 71–99 | 6–8 | Capital One Arena (5,529); Washington, D.C. |
SoCon regular season
| January 1, 2020; 2:00 pm, ESPN+ | | The Citadel | W 69–68 | 7–8 (1–0) | Pete Hanna Center (305); Homewood, AL |
| January 4, 2020; 12:00 pm, ESPN+ | | at VMI | W 78–75 | 8–8 (2–0) | Cameron Hall (786); Lexington, VA |
| January 8, 2020; 6:30 pm, ESPN+ | | Wofford | L 62–67 | 8–9 (2–1) | Pete Hanna Center (531); Homewood, AL |
| January 11, 2020; 1:00 pm, ESPN3 | | at Chattanooga | L 67–105 | 8–10 (2–2) | McKenzie Arena (2,872); Chattanooga, TN |
| January 15, 2020; 6:00 pm, ESPN+ | | at East Tennessee State | L 63–88 | 8–11 (2–3) | Freedom Hall Civic Center (4,204); Johnson City, TN |
| January 18, 2020; 2:00 pm, ESPN3 | | Mercer | L 75–90 | 8–12 (2–4) | Pete Hanna Center (763); Homewood, AL |
| January 22, 2020; 6:00 pm, ESPN+ | | at Furman | L 78–101 | 8–13 (2–5) | Timmons Arena (1,399); Greenville, SC |
| January 25, 2020; 2:00 pm, ESPN3 | | UNC Greensboro | L 63–70 | 8–14 (2–6) | Pete Hanna Center (503); Homewood, AL |
| January 29, 2020; 6:30 pm, ESPN+ | | Chattanooga | L 84–92 | 8–15 (2–7) | Pete Hanna Center (703); Homewood, AL |
| February 1, 2020; 6:00 pm, ESPN3 | | at Wofford | L 56–80 | 8–16 (2–8) | Jerry Richardson Indoor Stadium (2,191); Spartanburg, SC |
| February 5, 2020; 6:30 pm, ESPN3 | | Western Carolina | L 70–78 | 8–17 (2–9) | Pete Hanna Center (378); Homewood, AL |
| February 9, 2020; 12:00 pm, ESPN+ | | at UNC Greensboro | L 67–98 | 8–18 (2–10) | Greensboro Coliseum (4,158); Greensboro, NC |
| February 12, 2020; 6:30 pm, ESPN+ | | Furman | L 71–86 | 8–19 (2–11) | Pete Hanna Center (608); Homewood, AL |
| February 15, 2020; 12:00 pm, ESPN3 | | at The Citadel | W 74–62 | 9–19 (3–11) | McAlister Field House (833); Charleston, SC |
| February 19, 2020; 6:00 pm, ESPN+ | | at Mercer | L 66–106 | 9–20 (3–12) | Hawkins Arena (2,972); Macon, GA |
| February 22, 2020; 2:00 pm, ESPN+ | | East Tennessee State | L 74–80 | 9–21 (3–13) | Pete Hanna Center (511); Homewood, AL |
| February 26, 2020; 6:00 pm, ESPN+ | | at Western Carolina | L 78–109 | 9–22 (3–14) | Ramsey Center (1,474); Cullowhee, NC |
| February 29, 2020; 4:00 pm, ESPN3 | | VMI | W 84–78 | 10–22 (4–14) | Pete Hanna Center (521); Homewood, AL |
SoCon tournament
| March 6, 2020; 5:00 pm, ESPN+ | (8) | vs. (9) VMI; First round | L 78–96 | 10–23 | Harrah's Cherokee Center (2,338); Asheville, NC |
*Non-conference game. ^{#}Rankings from AP Poll. (#) Tournament seedings in parentheses. All times are in Central.
