= 2021–22 Southern Conference men's basketball season =

2021-22 Southern Conference men's basketball season
- League: NCAA Division I
- Sport: Basketball
- Teams: 10

Regular Season

2022 Southern Conference Tournament

Seasons
- ← 2020-21 2022-23 →

2021–22 Southern Conference men's basketball standings
	Conf.				Overall
Team	W		L	PCT	W		L	PCT
Chattanooga †	14	–	4	.778	27	–	8	.771
Furman	12	–	6	.667	22	–	12	.647
Samford	10	–	8	.556	21	–	11	.656
Wofford	10	–	8	.556	19	–	13	.594
VMI	9	–	9	.500	16	–	16	.500
UNC Greensboro	9	–	9	.500	17	–	15	.531
Mercer	8	–	10	.444	16	–	17	.485
East Tennessee State	7	–	11	.389	15	–	17	.469
The Citadel	6	–	12	.333	13	–	17	.433
Western Carolina	5	–	13	.278	11	–	21	.344
† 2022 SoCon Tournament winner

The 2021–22 Southern Conference men's basketball season started non-conference play on November 9, 2021, and began conference play on December 29, 2021. The regular season ended on February 27, 2022, setting up the 2022 Southern Conference men's basketball tournament from March 4 to March 7.

== Conference Schedule ==
Each team is scheduled to play 18 conference games. Each team will play every team twice, once at home and once on the road.

== Head coaches ==
=== Coach Changes ===
East Tennessee State hired Desmond Oliver to replace Jason Shay who left for Wake Forest to become an assistant.

UNC Greensboro hired Mike Jones to replace Wes Miller who left for Cincinnati to become head coach.

Western Carolina hired Justin Gray to replace Mark Prosser who left for Winthrop to become head coach.

=== Coaches ===
Team	Head Coach	Previous Job	Years At School	Record at School	SoCon Record	SoCon Titles	NCAA Tournaments
Chattanooga	Lamont Paris	Wisconsin (Assistant)	5	60-63	29-41	0	0
The Citadel	Duggar Baucom	VMI	7	64-118	21-85	0	0
East Tennessee State	Desmond Oliver	Tennessee (Assistant)	1	0-0	0-0	0	0
Furman	Bob Richey	Furman (Assistant)	5	89-35	51-18	0	0
Mercer	Greg Gary	Purdue (Assistant)	3	33-25	19-16	0	0
Samford	Bucky McMillan	Mountain Brook HS	2	6-13	2-9	0	0
UNC Greensboro	Mike Jones	Radford	1	0-0	0-0	0	0
VMI	Dan Earl	Navy (Associate HC)	7	57-123	25-79	0	0
Western Carolina	Justin Gray	Winthrop (Assistant)	1	0-0	0-0	0	0
Wofford	Jay McAuley	Wofford (Assistant)	3	34-24	20-15	0	0

Notes:

- Year at school includes 2021–22 season.
- Overall and SoCon records are from the time at current school and are through the end of the 2020–21 season.
- NCAA Tournament appearances are from the time at current school only.

== Preseason Awards ==
The Preseason Southern Conference men's basketball polls was released on October 26, 2021.

=== Preseason men's basketball polls ===
First Place Votes in Parentheses

==== Coaches Poll ====
1. Chattanooga (7) - 77
2. Furman (2) - 71
3. East Tennessee State - 59
4. Mercer (1) - 58
5. Wofford - 49
6. UNC Greensboro - 45
7. VMI - 32
8. Samford - 24
9. The Citadel - 23
10. Western Carolina - 12

==== Media Poll ====
1. Chattanooga (18) - 254
2. Furman (3) - 220
3. Wofford (1) - 191
4. Mercer (2) - 190
5. East Tennessee State - 186
6. UNC Greensboro (3) - 160
7. VMI - 104
8. The Citadel - 74
9. Samford - 57
10. Western Carolina - 49

=== Preseason Honors ===
Honor	Recipient
Preseason Player of the Year	Hayden Brown, The Citadel
Preseason All-Southern Conference Team	Hayden Brown, The Citadel
Preseason All-Southern Conference Team	Ledarrius Brewer, East Tennessee State
Preseason All-Southern Conference Team	David Sloan, East Tennessee State
Preseason All-Southern Conference Team	Mike Bothwell, Furman
Preseason All-Southern Conference Team	Alex Hunter, Furman
Preseason All-Southern Conference Team	Neftali Alvarez, Mercer
Preseason All-Southern Conference Team	Felipe Haase, Mercer
Preseason All-Southern Conference Team	David Jean-Baptiste, Chattanooga
Preseason All-Southern Conference Team	Malachi Smith, Chattanooga
Preseason All-Southern Conference Team	Jake Stephens, VMI

== Regular season ==
=== Conference standings ===
		Conference		Overall		
Rank	Team	Record	Percent	Record	Percent	Tiebreaker
1	Chattanooga	14-4	.778	24-7	.774	
2	Furman	12-6	.667	20-11	.645	
3	Samford	10-8	.556	20-10	.667	1-1 vs Chattanooga
4	Wofford	10-8	.556	18-12	.600	0-2 vs Chattanooga
5	VMI	9-9	.500	16-14	.533	1-1 vs Mercer
6	UNC Greensboro	9-9	.500	17-13	.567	0-2 vs Mercer
7	Mercer	8-10	.444	15-16	.584	
8	East Tennessee State	7-11	.389	15-16	.484	
9	The Citadel	6-12	.333	12-17	.484	
10	Western Carolina	5-13	.278	11-20	.355	

=== Conference Matrix ===
	Chattanooga	The Citadel	East Tennessee State	Furman	Mercer	Samford	UNC Greensboro	VMI	Western Carolina	Wofford
vs. Chattanooga	–	0-2	0-2	0-2	0-2	1-1	1-1	1-1	1-1	0-1
vs. The Citadel	2-0	–	1-1	2-0	1-1	1-1	1-1	1-1	1-1	2-0
vs. East Tennessee State	2-0	1-1	–	1-1	1-1	1-1	1-1	1-1	1-1	2-0
vs. Furman	2-0	0-2	1-1	–	0-2	1-1	1-1	1-1	0-2	0-2
vs. Mercer	2-0	1-1	1-1	2-0	–	1-1	0-2	1-1	1-1	1-1
vs. Samford	1-1	1-1	1-1	1-1	1-1	–	1-1	1-1	0-2	1-1
vs. UNC Greensboro	1-1	1-1	1-1	1-1	2-0	1-1	–	1-1	0-2	1-1
vs. VMI	1-1	1-1	1-1	1-1	1-1	1-1	1-1	–	1-1	1-1
vs. Western Carolina	1-1	1-1	1-1	2-0	1-1	2-0	2-0	1-1	–	2-0
vs. Wofford	2-0	0-2	0-2	2-0	1-1	1-1	1-1	1-1	0-2	–

=== Players of the Week ===
Week	Player(s) of the Week	School
Nov. 15	Mike Bothwell	Furman
Nov. 22	Malachi Smith	Chattanooga
Nov. 29	Max Klesmit	Wofford
Dec. 6	Jalen Slawson	Furman (2)
Dec. 13	Jake Stephens	VMI
Dec. 20	Malachi Smith (2)	Chattanooga (2)
Dec. 27	Ques Glover	Samford
Jan. 3	Jake Stephens (2)	VMI (2)
Jan. 10	Malachi Smith (3)	Chattanooga (3)
Jan. 17	Jake Stephens (3)	VMI (3)
Jan. 24	Malachi Smith (4)	Chattanooga (4)
Jan. 31	Jordan King	ETSU
Feb. 7	Nicholas Robinson	Western Carolina
Feb. 14	Jake Stephens (4)	VMI (4)
Feb. 21	Trey Bonham	VMI (5)
Feb. 28	Hayden Brown	The Citadel

=== Players of the Month ===
Month	Player(s) of the Week	School
November	Hayden Brown	The Citadel
December	Jacksen Greco	Mercer
January	Malachi Smith	Chattanooga
February	Jake Stephens	VMI

=== Records against other conferences ===
Power 7 Conferences	Record	Power 7 Conferences	Record
ACC	2-5	American	0-1
Big East	None	Big Ten	None
Big 12	None	Pac-12	1-0
SEC	3-6	Power 7 Total	6-12
Other Division I Conferences	Record	Other Division I Conferences	Record
America East	2-1	Atlantic 10	1-3
ASUN	5-1	Big Sky	None
Big South	15-10	Big West	None
Colonial	2-2	Conference USA	1-4
Horizon League	2-0	Ivy League	None
MAAC	0-2	MAC	2-0
MEAC	3-1	MVC	1-0
MWC	None	NEC	None
OVC	5-4	Patriot League	2-1
Southland	1-1	SWAC	2-0
Summit League	None	Sun Belt	5-3
WAC	1-0	WCC	2-1
Other Division I Total			52-34
NCAA Division I Total			58-46
NCAA Division II Total			4-0
NCAA Division III Total			8-0
NAIA Total			6-0
NCCAA Total			2-0
Total Non-Conference Record			78-46

== Conference Tournament ==
The 2022 Ingles SoCon Tournament will be held in Asheville, North Carolina at Harrah's Cherokee Center from March 4 to March 7.

First round March 4 ESPN+
8	East Tennessee State	76
9	The Citadel	84*
7	Mercer	81
10	Western Carolina	53

Quarterfinals; March 5 ESPN+/Nexstar
1	Chattanooga	71
9	The Citadel	66
4	Wofford	68
5	VMI	66
2	Furman	80
7	Mercer	66
3	Samford	66
6	UNC Greensboro	64

Semifinals; March 6 ESPNU
1	Chattanooga	79
4	Wofford	56
2	Furman	71
3	Samford	68

Championship; March 7 ESPN
1	Chattanooga
2	Furman
