= 2021–22 Wofford Terriers men's basketball team =

American college basketball season

2021–22 Wofford Terriers men's basketball

The Basketball Classic, withdrew
- Conference: Southern Conference
- Record: 19–13 (10–8 SoCon)
- Head coach: Jay McAuley (3rd season)
- Associate head coach: Dwight Perry
- Assistant coaches: Paul Hemrick; Will Murphy
- Home arena: Jerry Richardson Indoor Stadium

2021–22 Southern Conference men's basketball standings
	Conf.				Overall
Team	W		L	PCT	W		L	PCT
Chattanooga †	14	–	4	.778	27	–	8	.771
Furman	12	–	6	.667	22	–	12	.647
Samford	10	–	8	.556	21	–	11	.656
Wofford	10	–	8	.556	19	–	13	.594
VMI	9	–	9	.500	16	–	16	.500
UNC Greensboro	9	–	9	.500	17	–	15	.531
Mercer	8	–	10	.444	16	–	17	.485
East Tennessee State	7	–	11	.389	15	–	17	.469
The Citadel	6	–	12	.333	13	–	17	.433
Western Carolina	5	–	13	.278	11	–	21	.344
† 2022 SoCon Tournament winner

The 2021–22 Wofford Terriers men's basketball team represented Wofford College in the 2021–22 NCAA Division I men's basketball season. The Terriers, led by third-year head coach Jay McAuley, played their home games at Jerry Richardson Indoor Stadium in Spartanburg, South Carolina as a member of the Southern Conference (SoCon). They finished the season 19–13, 10–8 in SoCon play, to finish in a tie for third place. As the No. 4 seed in the SoCon tournament, they defeated VMI in the quarterfinals before losing to Chattanooga in the semifinals.

== Previous season ==
In a season limited due to the ongoing COVID-19 pandemic, the Terriers finished the 2020–21 season 15–9, 12–5 in SoCon play, to finish in second place. They were upset by Mercer in the quarterfinals of the SoCon tournament.

== Roster ==
2021–22 Wofford Terriers men's basketball team
Players
Coaches

Pos.	#	Name	Height	Weight	Year	Hometown
G/F	0	Luke Turner	6 ft 7 in (2.01 m)	195 lb (88 kg)	Fr	Temecula, CA
G	1	Keaton Turner	6 ft 1 in (1.85 m)	165 lb (75 kg)	So	Hopewell, VA
G	2	Max Klesmit	6 ft 3 in (1.91 m)	190 lb (86 kg)	So	Neenah, WI
G	4	Isaiah Bigelow	6 ft 7 in (2.01 m)	200 lb (91 kg)	Jr	Greensboro, NC
G	10	Corey Tripp	6 ft 2 in (1.88 m)	195 lb (88 kg)	Fr	Medina, OH
G	11	Ryan Larson	6 ft 1 in (1.85 m)	180 lb (82 kg)	Sr	St. Paul, MN
F	12	Alex Michael	6 ft 6 in (1.98 m)	205 lb (93 kg)	Sr	Greensboro, NC
G	13	Morgan Safford	6 ft 5 in (1.96 m)	200 lb (91 kg)	So	Columbus, OH
F	14	Sam Godwin	6 ft 9 in (2.06 m)	230 lb (104 kg)	So	Moore, OK
G	15	Austin Patterson	6 ft 3 in (1.91 m)	185 lb (84 kg)	Fr	Sonora, CA
C	20	David Appelgren	7 ft 1 in (2.16 m)	245 lb (111 kg)	Sr	Stockholm, Sweden
F	21	Dante Kiesenhofer	6 ft 9 in (2.06 m)	220 lb (100 kg)	Fr	Raleigh, NC
G	22	Jonathan Steelman	6 ft 3 in (1.91 m)	180 lb (82 kg)	Jr	Aiken, SC
G	24	Jackson Gore	6 ft 3 in (1.91 m)	185 lb (84 kg)	So	Blacksburg, SC
F	25	Messiah Jones	6 ft 6 in (1.98 m)	220 lb (100 kg)	Jr	Chicago, IL
F/C	33	B.J. Mack	6 ft 8 in (2.03 m)	247 lb (112 kg)	Jr	Charlotte, NC

Head coach

- Jay McAuley (Georgia)

Assistant coach(es)

- Dwight Perry (Kentucky)
- Paul Hemrick (Georgia)
- Will Murphy (Wake Forest)

Legend

- (C) Team captain
- (S) Suspended
- (I) Ineligible
- (W) Walk-on
- Injured
- Current redshirt

Roster
Last update: November 5, 2021

== Schedule and results ==
Date time, TV	Rank^{#}	Opponent^{#}	Result	Record	High points	High rebounds	High assists	Site (attendance) city, state
Non-conference regular season
November 9, 2021*; 5:00 p.m., ESPN+		Bob Jones	W 117–79	1–0	23 – Klesmit	10 – Bigelow	6 – Larson	Jerry Richardson Indoor Stadium (1,350); Spartanburg, SC
November 12, 2021*; 7:00 p.m., ACCNX		at Clemson	L 68–76	1–1	16 – Jones	7 – Larson	4 – Larson	Littlejohn Coliseum (8,118); Clemson, SC
November 15, 2021*; 7:00 p.m., ESPN+		Erskine	W 98–41	2–1	16 – Godwin	10 – Bigelow	3 – Larson	Jerry Richardson Indoor Stadium (973); Spartanburg, SC
November 19, 2021*; 7:30 p.m., ESPN+		Hampton; Terrier Classic	W 77–60	3–1	18 – Mack	11 – Mack	6 – Mack	Jerry Richardson Indoor Stadium (1,025); Spartanburg, SC
November 21, 2021*; 5:00 p.m., ESPN+		Georgia Southern; Terrier Classic	W 70–52	4–1	19 – Larson	6 – Mack	3 – Larson	Jerry Richardson Indoor Stadium (791); Spartanburg, SC
November 23, 2021*; 7:00 p.m., SECN+		at South Carolina	L 74–85	4–2	27 – Klesmit	7 – Bigelow	6 – Larson	Colonial Life Arena (8,411); Columbia, SC
November 28, 2021*; 4:00 p.m., SECN+		at Georgia	W 68–65	5–2	17 – Klesmit	7 – Bigelow	3 – Larson	Stegeman Coliseum (6,090); Athens, GA
December 1, 2021*; 7:00 p.m., ESPN+		Richmond	L 64–73	5–3	15 – Mack	6 – Mack	3 – Larson	Jerry Richardson Indoor Stadium (1,576); Spartanburg, SC
December 5, 2021*; 2:00 p.m., ESPN+		Kennesaw State	W 88–62	6–3	24 – Mack	5 – Godwin	5 – Larson	Jerry Richardson Indoor Stadium (857); Spartanburg, SC
December 8, 2021*; 7:00 p.m., ESPN+		at Gardner–Webb	W 78–70	7–3	28 – Mack	13 – Mack	5 – Larson	Paul Porter Arena (552); Boiling Springs, NC
December 12, 2021*; 2:00 p.m., ESPN+		at Coastal Carolina	L 59–60	7–4	15 – Klesmit	4 – Tied	4 – Klesmit	HTC Center (970); Conway, SC
December 18, 2021*; 4:00 p.m., ESPN+		at Presbyterian	W 76–49	8–4	21 – Klesmit	6 – Godwin	6 – Larson	Templeton Physical Education Center (315); Clinton, SC
December 22, 2021*; 3:00 p.m.		at Duquesne	Cancelled due to COVID-19 issues					UPMC Cooper Fieldhouse; Pittsburgh, PA
SoCon regular season
December 29, 2021; 7:00 p.m., ESPN+		VMI	L 73–80	8–5 (0–1)	18 – Mack	7 – Bigelow	5 – Larson	Jerry Richardson Indoor Stadium (706); Spartanburg, SC
January 5, 2022; 7:00 p.m., ESPN+		Chattanooga	L 67–75	8–6 (0–2)	22 – Klesmit	7 – Safford	3 – Klesmit	Jerry Richardson Indoor Stadium (992); Spartanburg, SC
January 8, 2022; 4:00 p.m., ESPN+		at East Tennessee State	W 68–57	9–6 (1–2)	22 – Mack	9 – Bigelow	4 – Klesmit	Freedom Hall Civic Center (3,708); Johnson City, TN
January 10, 2022; 6:00 p.m., ESPN+		at UNC Greensboro; Rescheduled from Jan. 1	L 54–58	9–7 (1–3)	18 – Mack	7 – Mack	3 – Safford	Greensboro Coliseum (1,320); Greensboro, NC
January 12, 2022; 7:00 p.m., ESPN+		Samford	W 87–64	10–7 (2–3)	18 – Mack	6 – Bigelow	5 – Larson	Jerry Richardson Indoor Stadium (979); Spartanburg, SC
January 15, 2022; 2:00 p.m., ESPN+		at Western Carolina	W 84–64	11–7 (3–3)	22 – Mack	10 – Turner	5 – Mack	Ramsey Center (2,132); Cullowhee, NC
January 19, 2022; 7:00 p.m., ESPN+		The Citadel	W 89–77	12–7 (4–3)	27 – Klesmit	14 – Bigelow	5 – Larson	Jerry Richardson Indoor Stadium (1,147); Spartanburg, SC
January 22, 2022; 7:00 p.m., ESPN+		Furman	L 50–75	12–8 (4–4)	14 – Mack	10 – Bigelow	5 – Larson	Jerry Richardson Indoor Stadium (2,875); Spartanburg, SC
January 26, 2022; 7:00 p.m., ESPN+		at Chattanooga	L 60–71	12–9 (4–5)	18 – Mack	7 – Mack	4 – Mack	McKenzie Arena (3,211); Chattanooga, TN
January 29, 2022; 7:00 p.m., ESPN+		UNC Greensboro	W 85–66	13–9 (5–5)	18 – Klesmit	5 – Klesmit	6 – Larson	Jerry Richardson Indoor Stadium (1,597); Spartanburg, SC
January 31, 2022; 7:00 p.m., ESPNU		at Mercer	L 62–67	13–10 (5–6)	16 – Mack	6 – Bigelow	3 – Larson	Hawkins Arena (1,792); Macon, GA
February 5, 2022; 2:00 p.m., ESPN+		East Tennessee State	W 62–60	14–10 (6–6)	15 – Klesmit	6 – Patterson	5 – Mack	Jerry Richardson Indoor Stadium (1,118); Spartanburg, SC
February 9, 2022; 8:00 p.m., ESPN+		at Samford	L 60–65 ^{OT}	14–11 (6–7)	20 – Mack	10 – Mack	3 – Tied	Pete Hanna Center (1,343); Homewood, AL
February 12, 2022; 7:00 p.m., ESPN+		Western Carolina	W 69–57	15–11 (7–7)	17 – Mack	11 – Mack	6 – Klesmit	Jerry Richardson Indoor Stadium (1,222); Spartanburg, SC
February 16, 2022; 7:00 p.m., ESPN+		at The Citadel	W 65–58	16–11 (8–7)	17 – Klesmit	8 – Safford	5 – Mack	McAlister Field House (1,121); Charleston, SC
February 19, 2022; 12:00 p.m., ESPN+		at Furman	L 69–70	16–12 (8–8)	17 – Mack	7 – Mack	4 – Larson	Bon Secours Wellness Arena (5,332); Greenville, SC
February 23, 2022; 7:00 p.m., ESPN+		at VMI	W 83–72	17–12 (9–8)	22 – Klesmit	7 – Mack	4 – Larson	Cameron Hall (1,067); Lexington, VA
February 26, 2022; 7:00 p.m., ESPN+		Mercer	W 74–67	18–12 (10–8)	26 – Mack	6 – Klesmit	3 – Larson	Jerry Richardson Indoor Stadium (1,551); Spartanburg, SC
SoCon tournament
March 5, 2022; 2:30 p.m., ESPN+	(4)	vs. (5) VMI; Quarterfinals	W 68–66	19–12	17 – Safford	10 – Mack	4 – Safford	Harrah's Cherokee Center; Asheville, NC
March 6, 2022; 4:00 p.m., ESPNU	(4)	vs. (1) Chattanooga; Semifinals	L 56–79	19–13	20 – Mack	10 – Mack	3 – Larson	Harrah's Cherokee Center; Asheville, NC
The Basketball Classic
March 19, 2022*; 2:00 p.m.		Youngstown State; Second round	Canceled due to Wofford withdrawing from the tournament					Beegley Center; Youngstown, OH
*Non-conference game. ^{#}Rankings from AP poll. (#) Tournament seedings in parentheses. All times are in Eastern.
