= 2021–22 The Citadel Bulldogs basketball team =

American college basketball season

2021–22 The Citadel Bulldogs basketball
- Conference: Southern Conference
- Record: 13–18 (6–12 SoCon)
- Head coach: Duggar Baucom (7th season)
- Associate head coach: Jack Castleberry
- Assistant coaches: Josh Hayes; Brad Mason
- Home arena: McAlister Field House

2021–22 Southern Conference men's basketball standings
	Conf.				Overall
Team	W		L	PCT	W		L	PCT
Chattanooga †	14	–	4	.778	27	–	8	.771
Furman	12	–	6	.667	22	–	12	.647
Samford	10	–	8	.556	21	–	11	.656
Wofford	10	–	8	.556	19	–	13	.594
VMI	9	–	9	.500	16	–	16	.500
UNC Greensboro	9	–	9	.500	17	–	15	.531
Mercer	8	–	10	.444	16	–	17	.485
East Tennessee State	7	–	11	.389	15	–	17	.469
The Citadel	6	–	12	.333	13	–	17	.433
Western Carolina	5	–	13	.278	11	–	21	.344
† 2022 SoCon Tournament winner

The 2021–22 The Citadel Bulldogs basketball team represented The Citadel, The Military College of South Carolina in the 2021–22 NCAA Division I men's basketball season. The Bulldogs, led by seventh-year head coach Duggar Baucom, played their home games at McAlister Field House in Charleston, South Carolina as members of the Southern Conference (SoCon). They finished the season 13–18, 6–12 in SoCon play, to finish in ninth place. They defeated East Tennessee State in the first round of the SoCon tournament before losing to Chattanooga in the quarterfinals.

On March 10, 2022, the school fired head coach Duggar Baucom. On March 23, the school named former Minnesota and Vanderbilt assistant Ed Conroy the team's new head coach. Conroy was the head coach of the Bulldogs from 2006 to 2010.

== Previous season ==
In a season limited due to the ongoing COVID-19 pandemic, the Bulldogs finished 2020–21 with a record of 13–13, 5–11 in SoCon play, to finish in eighth place. They defeated Western Carolina in the first round of the SoCon tournament before losing to UNC Greensboro in the quarterfinals.

== Roster ==
2021–22 The Citadel Bulldogs men's basketball team
Players
Coaches

Pos.	#	Name	Height	Weight	Year	Hometown
F	0	Jackson Price	6 ft 8 in (2.03 m)	200 lb (91 kg)	Fr	Hiram, GA
F/C	1	Stephen Clark	6 ft 8 in (2.03 m)	200 lb (91 kg)	Jr	Charlotte, NC
G	2	Jackson Gammons	6 ft 3 in (1.91 m)	195 lb (88 kg)	RS So	High Point, NC
G	3	Rudy III Fitzgibbons	6 ft 0 in (1.83 m)	145 lb (66 kg)	Jr	Atlanta, GA
G	4	Robert Guyton	6 ft 0 in (1.83 m)	165 lb (75 kg)	Sr	Myrtle Beach, SC
G	5	David Maynard	6 ft 4 in (1.93 m)	205 lb (93 kg)	GS	Herriman, UT
G	10	Brock Wakefield	6 ft 3 in (1.91 m)	180 lb (82 kg)	Fr	Annapolis, MD
F	11	Jason Roche	6 ft 5 in (1.96 m)	180 lb (82 kg)	Fr	Berkeley, CA
G	12	Brent Davis	6 ft 3 in (1.91 m)	190 lb (86 kg)	So	Miramar, FL
G	13	Tyler Moffe	6 ft 1 in (1.85 m)	175 lb (79 kg)	GS	Elmira, NY
F/C	14	Brady Spence	6 ft 9 in (2.06 m)	200 lb (91 kg)	Jr	Douglasville, GA
G	15	Jerry III Higgins	5 ft 10 in (1.78 m)	175 lb (79 kg)	RS Jr	Cleveland, OH
F	23	Owen Spencer	6 ft 9 in (2.06 m)	205 lb (93 kg)	So	Cincinnati, OH
G	24	Dylan Engler	6 ft 5 in (1.96 m)	185 lb (84 kg)	So	Oswego, IL
F	33	Hayden Brown	6 ft 5 in (1.96 m)	225 lb (102 kg)	GS	Greer, SC

Head coach

- Duggar Baucom (Charlotte)

Assistant coach(es)

- Jack Castleberry (VMI)
- Josh Hayes (Methodist)
- Brad Mason (Texas Tech)

Legend

- (C) Team captain
- (S) Suspended
- (I) Ineligible
- (W) Walk-on
- Injured
- Current redshirt

Roster
Last update: November 23, 2021

== Schedule and results ==
Date time, TV	Rank^{#}	Opponent^{#}	Result	Record	Site (attendance) city, state
Non-conference regular season
November 9, 2021*; 7:00 p.m., ACCN		at Pittsburgh	W 78–63	1–0	Petersen Events Center (7,585); Pittsburgh, PA
November 12, 2021*; 12:00 p.m., ESPN+		Morris College	W 108–67	2–0	McAlister Field House (937); Charleston, SC
November 15, 2021*; 7:00 p.m., ESPN+		at Presbyterian	L 70–74 ^{2OT}	2–1	Templeton Physical Education Center (772); Clinton, SC
November 18, 2021*; 7:00 p.m., ESPN+		Carver College	W 102–49	3–1	McAlister Field House (731); Charleston, SC
November 22, 2021*; 9:00 p.m., ACCN		at No. 5 Duke	L 81–107	3–2	Cameron Indoor Stadium (9,314); Durham, NC
November 28, 2021*; 2:00 p.m.		at South Carolina State	W 91–79 ^{OT}	4–2	SHM Memorial Center (400); Orangeburg, SC
December 1, 2021*; 6:30 p.m.		at UNC Asheville	L 58–65	4–3	Kimmel Arena (751); Asheville, NC
December 6, 2021*; 7:00 p.m.		North Carolina Central	W 80–67	5–3	McAlister Field House (711); Charleston, SC
December 16, 2021*; 7:00 p.m.		St. Andrews	W 102-62	6–3	McAlister Field House (732); Charleston, SC
December 20, 2021*; 5:00 p.m.		South Carolina State; Cobb Dill & Hammett Classic	L 57-74	6–4	McAlister Field House (913); Charleston, SC
December 21, 2021*; 7:00 p.m.		Manhattan; Cobb Dill & Hammett Classic	L 74–77	6–5	McAlister Field House (799); Charleston, SC
SoCon regular season
January 5, 2022; 7:00 p.m.		at Western Carolina	L 90–95 ^{OT}	6–6 (0–1)	Ramsey Center (892); Cullowhee, NC
January 8, 2022; 4:00 p.m.		at Chattanooga	L 67–85	6–7 (0–2)	McKenzie Arena (2,284); Chattanooga, TN
January 13, 2022; 7:00 p.m.		UNC Greensboro	W 74–69	7–7 (1–2)	McAlister Field House (1,298); Charleston, SC
January 15, 2022; 1:00 p.m.		VMI	L 85–90	7–8 (1–3)	McAlister Field House (1,256); Charleston, SC
January 17, 2022; 7:00 p.m.		Mercer; Rescheduled from December 29	L 64–71	7–9 (1–4)	McAlister Field House (731); Charleston, SC
January 19, 2022; 7:00 p.m.		at Wofford	L 77–89	7–10 (1–5)	Jerry Richardson Indoor Stadium (1,147); Spartanburg, SC
January 22, 2022; 4:00 p.m.		at East Tennessee State	W 75–73	8–10 (2–5)	Freedom Hall Civic Center (3,425); Johnson City, TN
January 26, 2022; 7:00 p.m.		Western Carolina	W 68–66	9–10 (3–5)	McAlister Field House (1,103); Charleston, SC
January 29, 2022; 1:00 p.m.		Chattanooga	L 62–75	9–11 (3–6)	McAlister Field House (1,003); Charleston, SC
February 2, 2022; 7:00 p.m.		at Furman	L 83–102	9–12 (3–7)	Timmons Arena (1,749); Greenville, SC
February 5, 2022; 1:00 p.m.		Samford	W 107–93	10–12 (4–7)	McAlister Field House (1,137); Charleston, SC
February 10, 2022; 1:00 p.m.		at UNC Greensboro	L 66–86	10–13 (4–8)	Greensboro Coliseum (1,536); Greensboro, NC
February 12, 2022; 1:00 p.m.		at VMI	W 83–79	11–13 (5–8)	Cameron Hall (3,745); Lexington, VA
February 16, 2022; 7:00 p.m.		Wofford	L 58–65	11–14 (5–9)	McAlister Field House (1,121); Charleston, SC
February 19, 2022; 1:00 p.m.		East Tennessee State	L 67–77	11–15 (5–10)	McAlister Field House (929); Charleston, SC
February 21, 2022; 8:00 p.m.		at Samford; Rescheduled from January 1	L 74–76	11–16 (5–11)	Pete Hanna Center (1,632); Homewood, AL
February 23, 2022; 7:00 p.m.		at Mercer	W 71–67	12–16 (6–11)	Hawkins Arena (2,221); Macon, GA
February 26, 2022; 1:00 p.m.		Furman	L 59–94	12–17 (6–12)	McAlister Field House (2,573); Charleston, SC
SoCon tournament
March 4, 2022; 5:00 p.m., ESPN+	(9)	vs. (8) East Tennessee State; First round	W 84–76 ^{OT}	13–17	Harrah's Cherokee Center; Asheville, NC
March 5, 2022; 12:00 p.m., ESPN+/Nexstar	(9)	vs. (1) Chattanooga; Quarterfinals	L 66–71	13–18	Harrah's Cherokee Center; Asheville, NC
*Non-conference game. ^{#}Rankings from AP poll. (#) Tournament seedings in parentheses. All times are in Eastern.
