= 2021–22 Western Carolina Catamounts men's basketball team =

American college basketball season

2021–22 Western Carolina Catamounts men's basketball
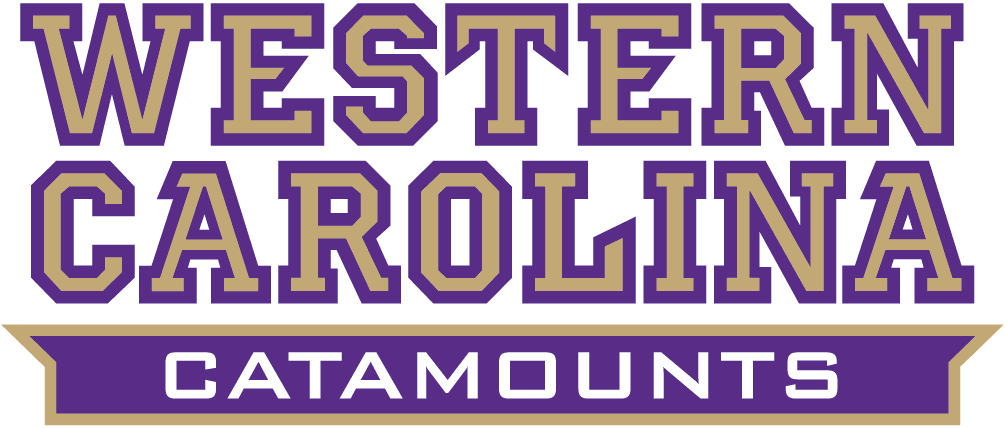
- Conference: Southern Conference
- Record: 11–21 (5–13 SoCon)
- Head coach: Justin Gray (1st season)
- Associate head coach: Jayson Gee
- Assistant coaches: Brian Graves; Zack Freesman
- Home arena: Ramsey Center

2021–22 Southern Conference men's basketball standings
	Conf.				Overall
Team	W		L	PCT	W		L	PCT
Chattanooga †	14	–	4	.778	27	–	8	.771
Furman	12	–	6	.667	22	–	12	.647
Samford	10	–	8	.556	21	–	11	.656
Wofford	10	–	8	.556	19	–	13	.594
VMI	9	–	9	.500	16	–	16	.500
UNC Greensboro	9	–	9	.500	17	–	15	.531
Mercer	8	–	10	.444	16	–	17	.485
East Tennessee State	7	–	11	.389	15	–	17	.469
The Citadel	6	–	12	.333	13	–	17	.433
Western Carolina	5	–	13	.278	11	–	21	.344
† 2022 SoCon Tournament winner

The 2021–22 Western Carolina Catamounts men's basketball team represented Western Carolina University in the 2021–22 NCAA Division I men's basketball season. The Catamounts, led by first-year head coach Justin Gray, played their home games at the Ramsey Center in Cullowhee, North Carolina, as members of the Southern Conference. They finished the season 11–21, 5–13 in SoCon play to finish in last place. They lost to Mercer in the first round of the SoCon tournament.

== Previous season ==
In a season limited due to the ongoing COVID-19 pandemic, the Catamounts finished the 2019–20 season 11–16, 4–13 in SoCon play to finish in ninth place. They lost in the first round of the SoCon tournament to The Citadel.

== Offseason ==
=== Player departures ===
Name	Pos.	Height	Weight	Year	Hometown	Reason for departure
Sin'Cere McMahon	G	6'1"	167	Freshman	Indianapolis, IN	Transferred to Winthrop
Matt Halvorsen	G	6'1"	183	Senior	Kingsport, TN	Transferred to Florida Gulf Coast
Kennedy Miles	G	6'1"	165	Freshman	Burlington, NC	Transferred to Lawson State CC
Douglas Elks	G/F	6'5"	200	RS Junior	Raleigh, NC	Left team
Mason Faulkner	G	6'1"	190	RS Senior	Glasgow, KY	Transferred to Louisville
Cory Hightower	F	6'7"	222	RS Junior	Flint, MI	Transferred to Winthrop
Xavier Cork	F	6'9"	235	Sophomore	Sulphur Springs, TX	Transferred to TCU
Kameron Gibson	G	6'3"	192	Junior	Cincinnati, OH	Transferred to Vermont
Daniel Ransom	F	6'5"	214	Freshman	Charlotte, NC	Left team
Marcus Thomas	G	6'3"	185	Senior	Mint Hill, NC	Graduated
Tyler McGhie	G	6'5"	188	Freshman	Denton, TX	Transferred to Southern Nazarene
Ahmir Langlais	F	6'9"	218	RS Freshman	Atlanta, GA	Transferred to USC Upstate

=== Incoming transfers ===
Name	Pos.	Height	Weight	Year	Hometown	Previous School	Years Remaining
Vonterius Woolbright	G	6'5"	208	Junior	Albany, GA	Lawson State CC	2
Cam Bacote	G	6'3"	173	Graduate	Hampton, VA	Indiana State	1
Marvin Price	G	6'5"	230	Junior	Baltimore, MD	Salt Lake CC	2
Madison Monroe	G	6'3"	193	Junior	Charlotte, NC	Independence CC	2
Marlow Gilmore	F	6'5"	191	Junior	Norway, SC	Dodge City CC	2
Nicholas Robinson	G	6'6"	220	Graduate	Chicago, IL	Valparasio	1
Joe Petrakis	F	6'10"	224	RS Junior	Wichita, KS	Kansas State	2

=== 2021 recruiting class ===
College recruiting information
Name	Hometown	School	Height	Weight	Commit date
Marcus Banks; G	Hampton, VA	Fork Union Military Academy	6 ft 2 in (1.88 m)	187 lb (85 kg)	
Marcus Banks; G	Recruit ratings: No ratings found				
K.J. Odour; F	Kisumu, Kenya	Spire Academy	6 ft 9 in (2.06 m)	198 lb (90 kg)	
K.J. Odour; F	Recruit ratings: No ratings found				
Jordian Fox; F	Fayetteville, NC	Jack Britt High School	6 ft 5 in (1.96 m)	200 lb (91 kg)	
Jordian Fox; F	Recruit ratings: No ratings found				
Max Rogers; G	Waynesville, NC	Asheville Christian Academy	6 ft 2 in (1.88 m)	180 lb (82 kg)	
Max Rogers; G	Recruit ratings: No ratings found				
Davion Everette; G	Columbia, SC	Ridge View High School	6 ft 4 in (1.93 m)	215 lb (98 kg)	
Davion Everette; G	Recruit ratings: No ratings found				
Overall recruit ranking:
Note: In many cases, Scout, Rivals, 247Sports, On3, and ESPN may conflict in their listings of height and weight.; In these cases, the average was taken. ESPN grades are on a 100-point scale.; Sources:

== Roster ==
2021–22 Western Carolina Catamounts men's basketball team
Players
Coaches

Pos.	#	Name	Height	Weight	Year	Hometown
G	1	Travion McCray	6 ft 1 in (1.85 m)	181 lb (82 kg)	Jr	Timmonsville, South Carolina
G	2	Vonterius Woolbright	6 ft 5 in (1.96 m)	208 lb (94 kg)	Jr	Albany, Georgia
G/F	4	Tyler Harris	6 ft 6 in (1.98 m)	198 lb (90 kg)	Jr	Charlotte, North Carolina
G	5	Josh Massey	6 ft 6 in (1.98 m)	198 lb (90 kg)	So	Monroe, North Carolina
G	11	Cam Bacote	6 ft 3 in (1.91 m)	173 lb (78 kg)	GS	Hampton, Virginia
G	13	Marvin Price	6 ft 5 in (1.96 m)	230 lb (104 kg)	Jr	Baltimore, Maryland
G	21	Madison Monroe	6 ft 3 in (1.91 m)	193 lb (88 kg)	Jr	Charlotte, North Carolina
G	22	Brad Halvorsen	6 ft 1 in (1.85 m)	161 lb (73 kg)	So	Kingsport, Tennessee
F	23	Marlow Gilmore	6 ft 5 in (1.96 m)	191 lb (87 kg)	Jr	Norway, South Carolina
G	24	Marcus Banks	6 ft 2 in (1.88 m)	187 lb (85 kg)	Fr	Hampton, Virginia
G	25	Nicholas Robinson	6 ft 6 in (1.98 m)	220 lb (100 kg)	GS	Chicago, Illinois
F	33	Joe Petrakis	6 ft 10 in (2.08 m)	224 lb (102 kg)	RS Jr	Wichita, Kansas
F	34	K.J. Odour	6 ft 9 in (2.06 m)	198 lb (90 kg)	Fr	Kisumu, Kenya
F	41	Jordian Fox	6 ft 5 in (1.96 m)	200 lb (91 kg)	Fr	Fayetteville, North Carolina
G	42	Max Rogers	6 ft 2 in (1.88 m)	180 lb (82 kg)	Fr	Waynesville, North Carolina
G	45	Davion Everett	6 ft 4 in (1.93 m)	215 lb (98 kg)	Fr	Columbia, South Carolina

Head coach

- Justin Gray (Wake Forest)

Assistant coach(es)

- Jayson Gee (College of Charleston)
- Brian Graves (Catawba)
- Zack Freesman (North Florida)

Legend

- (C) Team captain
- (S) Suspended
- (I) Ineligible
- (W) Walk-on
- Injured
- Current redshirt

Roster
Last update: November 10, 2021

== Schedule and results ==
Date time, TV	Rank^{#}	Opponent^{#}	Result	Record	Site (attendance) city, state
Exhibition
November 1, 2021*; 7:00 pm		Campbellsville–Harrodsburg	W 106–62	–	Ramsey Center (934); Cullowhee, NC
Non-conference Regular season
November 9, 2021*; 7:30 pm, ESPN+		Bowling Green	W 79–71 ^{OT}	1–0	Ramsey Center (1,862); Cullowhee, NC
November 12, 2021*; 7:30 pm, ACCNX		at Wake Forest	L 75–87	1–1	LJVM Coliseum (4,359); Winston-Salem, NC
November 14, 2021*; 4:00 pm, ESPN+		at East Carolina	L 79–95	1–2	Williams Arena (3,245); Greenville, NC
November 19, 2021*; 8:00 pm, ESPN+		vs. UMBC; Lander Invitational	L 75–91	1–3	Willett Hall (174); Farmville, VA
November 20, 2021*; 3:30 pm, ESPN+		vs. American; Lander Invitational	W 80–79	2–3	Willett Hall (218); Farmville, VA
November 21, 2021*; 3:30 pm, ESPN+		at Longwood; Lander Invitational	W 64–53	3–3	Willett Hall (1518); Farmville, VA
November 27, 2021*; 2:00 pm, ESPN+		at Gardner–Webb	L 59–87	3–4	Paul Porter Arena (175); Boiling Springs, NC
December 1, 2021*; 5:00 pm, ESPN+		Warren Wilson	W 102–47	4–4	Ramsey Center (1,522); Cullowhee, NC
December 4, 2021*; 6:00 pm, ESPN+		at USC Upstate	W 78–73	5–4	G. B. Hodge Center (567); Spartanburg, SC
December 8, 2021*; 7:00 pm, ESPN+		Tennessee Tech	W 74–69 ^{OT}	6–4	Ramsey Center (1,722); Cullowhee, NC
December 11, 2021*; 2:00 pm, ESPN+		UNC Asheville	L 72–73	6–5	Ramsey Center (2,418); Cullowhee, NC
December 20, 2021*; 7:00 pm, SECN+		at Georgia	L 79–85	6–6	Stegeman Coliseum (7,271); Athens, GA
December 22, 2021*; 5:00 pm, CUSA.TV		at Charlotte	L 82–98	6–7	Dale F. Halton Arena (2,805); Charlotte, NC
SoCon Regular season
January 5, 2022; 7:00 pm, ESPN+		The Citadel	W 94–90 ^{OT}	7–7 (1–0)	Ramsey Center (892); Cullowhee, NC
January 8, 2022; 3:00 pm, ESPN+		at Samford	L 65–80	7–8 (1–1)	Pete Hanna Center (703); Homewood, AL
January 10, 2022; 7:00 pm, ESPN+		at East Tennessee State; Rescheduled from Jan. 1	L 69–87	7–9 (1–2)	Freedom Hall Civic Center (2,552); Johnson City, TN
January 12, 2022; 7:00 pm, ESPN+		Chattanooga	W 70–59	8–9 (2–2)	Ramsey Center (2,749); Cullowhee, NC
January 15, 2022; 2:00 pm, ESPN+		Wofford	L 64–84	8–10 (2–3)	Ramsey Center (2,132); Cullowhee, NC
January 19, 2022; 7:00 pm, ESPN+		at Furman	L 50–88	8–11 (2–4)	Timmons Arena (1,464); Greenville, SC
January 22, 2022; 5:00 pm, ESPN+		at Mercer	L 64–72	8–12 (2–5)	Hawkins Arena (2,271); Macon, GA
January 26, 2022; 7:00 pm, ESPN+		at The Citadel	L 66–68	8–13 (2–6)	McAlister Field House (1,103); Charleston, SC
January 29, 2022; 2:00 pm, ESPN+		Samford	L 64–74	8–14 (2–7)	Ramsey Center (1,381); Cullowhee, NC
February 2, 2022; 7:00 pm, ESPN+		East Tennessee State	W 87–84	9–14 (3–7)	Ramsey Center (1,086); Cullowhee, NC
February 4, 2022; 7:00 pm, ESPN+		at VMI	L 69–76	9–15 (3–8)	Cameron Hall (2,434); Lexington, VA
February 7, 2022; 7:00 pm, ESPN+		UNC Greensboro; Rescheduled from Dec. 29	L 49–68	9–16 (3–9)	Ramsey Center (1,007); Cullowhee, NC
February 9, 2022; 7:00 pm, ESPN+		at Chattanooga	L 47–65	9–17 (3–10)	McKenzie Arena (3,128); Chattanooga, TN
February 12, 2022; 7:00 pm, ESPN+		at Wofford	L 57–69	9–18 (3–11)	Jerry Richardson Indoor Stadium (1,222); Spartanburg, SC
February 16, 2022; 7:00 pm, ESPN+		Furman	L 85–103	9–19 (3–12)	Ramsey Center (1,209); Cullowhee, NC
February 19, 2022; 2:00 pm, ESPN+		Mercer	W 69–65	10–19 (4–12)	Ramsey Center (1,721); Cullowhee, NC
February 23, 2022; 7:00 pm, ESPN+		at UNC Greensboro	L 64–73	10–20 (4–13)	Greensboro Coliseum (1,978); Greensboro, NC
February 26, 2022; 7:00 pm, ESPN+		VMI	W 82–73	11–20 (5–13)	Ramsey Center (2,026); Cullowhee, NC
SoCon tournament
March 4, 2022; 7:30 pm, ESPN+	(10)	vs. (7) Mercer; First Round	L 53–81	11–21	Harrah's Cherokee Center (3,113); Asheville, NC
*Non-conference game. ^{#}Rankings from AP Poll. (#) Tournament seedings in parentheses. All times are in Eastern.
