= 2022 Southern Conference men's basketball tournament =

Postseason men's basketball tournament

- Classification: Division I
- Season: 2021–22
- Teams: 10
- Site: Harrah's Cherokee Center; Asheville, North Carolina
- Champions: Chattanooga (12th title)
- Winning coach: Lamont Paris (1st title)
- Television: ESPN+, Nexstar, ESPNU, ESPN

2021–22 Southern Conference men's basketball standings
	Conf.				Overall
Team	W		L	PCT	W		L	PCT
Chattanooga †	14	–	4	.778	27	–	8	.771
Furman	12	–	6	.667	22	–	12	.647
Samford	10	–	8	.556	21	–	11	.656
Wofford	10	–	8	.556	19	–	13	.594
VMI	9	–	9	.500	16	–	16	.500
UNC Greensboro	9	–	9	.500	17	–	15	.531
Mercer	8	–	10	.444	16	–	17	.485
East Tennessee State	7	–	11	.389	15	–	17	.469
The Citadel	6	–	12	.333	13	–	17	.433
Western Carolina	5	–	13	.278	11	–	21	.344
† 2022 SoCon Tournament winner

The 2022 Southern Conference men's basketball tournament was the postseason men's basketball tournament for the Southern Conference (SoCon) for the 2021–22 season. All tournament games were played at the Harrah's Cherokee Center in Asheville, North Carolina, during March 4–7, 2022. The winner of the tournament received the conference's automatic bid to the 2022 NCAA Division I men's basketball tournament.

In the championship game, David Jean-Baptiste scored a buzzer-beating three-pointer to give Chattanooga a 64–63 overtime win over Furman. It was Chattanooga's first SoCon men's basketball title since 2016.

== Seeds ==
All ten teams in the Southern Conference were eligible to compete in the conference tournament. Teams were seeded by record within the conference, with a tiebreaker system to seed teams with identical conference records. Tiebreakers used are 1) head-to-head results, 2) comparison of records against individual teams in the conference starting with the top-ranked team and working down and 3) NCAA NET rankings on the first available report after the regular season is complete. Samford was seeded over Wofford due to having a better record against conference top seed Chattanooga. VMI was seeded over UNC Greensboro due to having a better record against Mercer. The top six teams received first-round byes.

Seed	School	Conference	NET ranking (March 3, 2021)
1	Chattanooga	14–4	69th
2	Furman	12–6	81st
3	Samford	10–8	180th
4	Wofford	10–8	105th
5	VMI	9–9	157th
6	UNC Greensboro	9–9	159th
7	Mercer	8–10	192nd
8	East Tennessee State	7–11	173rd
9	The Citadel	6–12	237th
10	Western Carolina	5–13	279th

== Schedule and results ==
Game	Time	Matchup	Score	Television
First round – Friday, March 4
1	5:00 pm	No. 8 East Tennessee State vs. No. 9 The Citadel	76–84	ESPN+
2	7:30 pm	No. 7 Mercer vs. No. 10 Western Carolina	81–53	ESPN+
Quarterfinals – Saturday, March 5
3	12:00 pm	No. 1 Chattanooga vs. No. 9 The Citadel	71–66	ESPN+/Nexstar
4	2:30 pm	No. 4 Wofford vs. No. 5 VMI	68–66	ESPN+/Nexstar
5	6:00 pm	No. 2 Furman vs. No. 7 Mercer	80–66	ESPN+/Nexstar
6	8:00 pm	No. 3 Samford vs. No. 6 UNC Greensboro	66–64	ESPN+/Nexstar
Semifinals – Sunday, March 6
7	4:00 pm	No. 1 Chattanooga vs. No. 4 Wofford	79–56	ESPNU
8	6:30 pm	No. 2 Furman vs. No. 3 Samford	71–68	ESPNU
Final – Monday, March 7
9	7:00 pm	No. 1 Chattanooga vs. No. 2 Furman	64–63^{OT}	ESPN
*Game times in EST. Rankings denote tournament seed

== Bracket ==
First round March 4 ESPN+
8	East Tennessee State	76
9	The Citadel	84
7	Mercer	81
10	Western Carolina	53

Quarterfinals; March 5 ESPN+/Nexstar
1	Chattanooga	71
9	The Citadel	66
4	Wofford	68
5	VMI	66
2	Furman	80
7	Mercer	66
3	Samford	66
6	UNC Greensboro	64

Semifinals; March 6 ESPNU
1	Chattanooga	79
4	Wofford	56
2	Furman	71
3	Samford	68

Championship; March 7 ESPN
1	Chattanooga	64*
2	Furman	63

== See also ==
- 2022 Southern Conference women's basketball tournament
