= 2021–22 VMI Keydets basketball team =

American college basketball season

2021–22 VMI Keydets basketball

CBI, First Round
- Conference: Southern Conference
- Record: 16–16 (9–9 SoCon)
- Head coach: Dan Earl (7th season)
- Associate head coach: Ander Galfsky (3rd season)
- Assistant coaches: Austin Kenon (5th season); Logan Dahms (3rd season)
- Home arena: Cameron Hall

2021–22 Southern Conference men's basketball standings
	Conf.				Overall
Team	W		L	PCT	W		L	PCT
Chattanooga †	14	–	4	.778	27	–	8	.771
Furman	12	–	6	.667	22	–	12	.647
Samford	10	–	8	.556	21	–	11	.656
Wofford	10	–	8	.556	19	–	13	.594
VMI	9	–	9	.500	16	–	16	.500
UNC Greensboro	9	–	9	.500	17	–	15	.531
Mercer	8	–	10	.444	16	–	17	.485
East Tennessee State	7	–	11	.389	15	–	17	.469
The Citadel	6	–	12	.333	13	–	17	.433
Western Carolina	5	–	13	.278	11	–	21	.344
† 2022 SoCon Tournament winner

The 2021–22 VMI Keydets basketball team represented the Virginia Military Institute in the 2021–22 NCAA Division I men's basketball season. The Keydets, led by seventh-year head coach Dan Earl, played their home games in Cameron Hall in Lexington, Virginia as members of the Southern Conference. They finished the regular season 16–15, 9–9 in SoCon play to finish in a tie for fifth place. As the No. 5 seed in the SoCon tournament, they lost to Wofford in the quarterfinals. They accepted an invitation to play in the College Basketball Invitational tournament marking their first postseason tournament appearance since 2014. As a No. 8 seed, they lost to No. 9-seeded UNC Wilmington in the first round.

== Previous season ==
In a season limited due to the ongoing COVID-19 pandemic, the Keydets finished the 2020–21 season 13–12, 7–7 in SoCon play to finish in sixth place. They upset Furman in overtime in the quarterfinals of the SoCon tournament, before falling to Mercer in the semifinals.

== Roster ==
2021–22 VMI Keydets men's basketball team
Players
Coaches

Pos.	#	Name	Height	Weight	Year	Hometown
G	0	Louis Tang	6 ft 1 in (1.85 m)	195 lb (88 kg)	Jr	Kaohsiung, Taiwan
G	1	Brennan Watkins	5 ft 11 in (1.8 m)	162 lb (73 kg)	Fr	Kearney, MO
G	2	Trey Bonham	6 ft 0 in (1.83 m)	170 lb (77 kg)	So	Mobile, AL
G	3	Honor Huff	5 ft 10 in (1.78 m)	155 lb (70 kg)	Fr	Brooklyn, NY
G	10	Kamdyn Curfman	6 ft 1 in (1.85 m)	186 lb (84 kg)	Jr	North Bethesda, MD
G	11	Devin Butler	6 ft 2 in (1.88 m)	195 lb (88 kg)	So	Ridgeland, SC
C	12	Lewis Rowe	6 ft 10 in (2.08 m)	260 lb (118 kg)	Fr	Adelaide, SA
F	14	Sam Wolfe	6 ft 8 in (2.03 m)	214 lb (97 kg)	Jr	Charlotte, NC
G	15	Cooper Sisco	6 ft 5 in (1.96 m)	185 lb (84 kg)	Fr	Frisco, TX
F	21	Connor Arnold	6 ft 7 in (2.01 m)	206 lb (93 kg)	Sr	Knoxville, TN
G	24	Tanner Mans	6 ft 6 in (1.98 m)	187 lb (85 kg)	So	Wichita, KS
G	30	Sean Conway	6 ft 5 in (1.96 m)	215 lb (98 kg)	Jr	Fairfield, CT
C	34	Jake Stephens	6 ft 11 in (2.11 m)	266 lb (121 kg)	Sr	Bunker Hill, WV
C	35	KC Etienne	6 ft 8 in (2.03 m)	225 lb (102 kg)	Fr	Newburgh, NY
C	42	DJ Nussbaum	6 ft 9 in (2.06 m)	230 lb (104 kg)	So	Houston, TX

Head coach

- Dan Earl (Penn State)

Assistant coach(es)

- Ander Galfsky (Birmingham–Southern)
- Austin Kenon (VMI)
- Logan Dahms (Texas A&M)

Legend

- (C) Team captain
- (S) Suspended
- (I) Ineligible
- (W) Walk-on
- Injured
- Current redshirt

Roster
Last update: November 23, 2021

== Schedule and results ==
Date time, TV	Rank^{#}	Opponent^{#}	Result	Record	Site (attendance) city, state
Non-conference regular season
November 9, 2021*; 7:00 pm, ESPN+		Carlow	W 111–55	1–0	Cameron Hall (1,039); Lexington, VA
November 12, 2021*; 7:00 pm, ESPN+		at Presbyterian	L 72–73 ^{OT}	1–1	Templeton Physical Education Center (510); Clinton, SC
November 16, 2021*; 7:00 pm, ESPN+		Keystone	W 97–35	2–1	Cameron Hall (347); Lexington, VA
November 20, 2021*; 5:00 pm, ESPN3		at Marist	L 74–78 ^{OT}	2–2	McCann Arena (1,183); Poughkeepsie, NY
November 24, 2021*; 4:00 pm		vs. Presbyterian; University of New Orleans Classic	L 54–59	2–3	Lakefront Arena (301); New Orleans, LA
November 25, 2021*; 4:00 pm		vs. Central Arkansas; University of New Orleans Classic	W 73–67	3–3	Lakefront Arena (347); New Orleans, LA
November 26, 2021*; 2:00 pm, ESPN+		at New Orleans; University of New Orleans Classic	L 71–79	3–4	Lakefront Arena (856); New Orleans, LA
November 30, 2021*; 7:00 pm, ESPN+		Clarks Summit	W 88–40	4–4	Cameron Hall (657); Lexington, VA
December 3, 2021*; 10:00 pm		at Portland	W 90–82	5–4	Chiles Center (1,171); Portland, OR
December 5, 2021*; 4:00 pm, ESPN+		at Seattle	W 89–82	6–4	Climate Pledge Arena (1334); Seattle, WA
December 11, 2021*; 1:00 pm, ESPN+		Gardner–Webb	W 64–61	7–4	Cameron Hall (2,306); Lexington, VA
December 14, 2021*; 7:00 pm, ACCNX		at Wake Forest	L 70–77	7–5	LJVM Coliseum (3,587); Winston-Salem, NC
December 22, 2021*; 4:00 pm, ESPN+		at Hampton	Cancelled due to COVID-19 Issues		Hampton Convocation Center; Hampton, VA
SoCon regular season
December 29, 2021; 7:00 pm, ESPN+		at Wofford	W 80–73	8–5 (1–0)	Jerry Richardson Indoor Stadium (706); Spartanburg, SC
January 1, 2022; 1:00 pm, ESPN+		Furman	W 76–67	9–5 (2–0)	Cameron Hall (650); Lexington, VA
January 5, 2022; 7:00 pm, ESPN+		at East Tennessee State	L 79–80	9–6 (2–1)	Freedom Hall Civic Center (2,922); Johnson City, TN
January 8, 2022; 1:00 pm, ESPN+		UNC Greensboro	L 56–72	9–7 (2–2)	Cameron Hall (747); Lexington, VA
January 13, 2022; 7:00 pm, ESPN+		at Mercer	L 91–97	9–8 (2–3)	Hawkins Arena (1,341); Macon, GA
January 15, 2022; 1:00 pm, ESPN+		at The Citadel	W 90–85	10–8 (3–3)	McAlister Field House (1,256); Charleston, SC
January 20, 2022; 7:00 pm, ESPN+		Samford	W 99–80	11–8 (4–3)	Cameron Hall (826); Lexington, VA
January 22, 2022; 1:00 pm, ESPN+		Chattanooga	L 74–78	11–9 (4–4)	Cameron Hall (2,345); Lexington, VA
January 26, 2022; 7:00 pm, ESPN+		at Furman	L 64–79	11–10 (4–5)	Timmons Arena (1,464); Greenville, SC
January 29, 2022; 1:00 pm, ESPN+		East Tennessee State	W 83–79	12–10 (5–5)	Cameron Hall (2,245); Lexington, VA
February 2, 2022; 7:00 pm, ESPN+		at UNC Greensboro	W 76–65	13–10 (6–5)	Greensboro Coliseum (1,559); Greensboro, NC
February 4, 2022; 6:00 pm, ESPN+		Western Carolina	W 76–69	14–10 (7–5)	Cameron Hall (2,434); Lexington, VA
February 10, 2022; 7:00 pm, ESPN+		Mercer	W 85–79	15–10 (8–5)	Cameron Hall (1,214); Lexington, VA
February 12, 2022; 3:30 pm, ESPN+		The Citadel	L 79–83	15–11 (8–6)	Cameron Hall (3,745); Lexington, VA
February 17, 2022; 7:00 pm, ESPN+		at Samford	L 99–100 ^{OT}	15–12 (8–7)	Pete Hanna Center (1,013); Homewood, AL
February 19, 2022; 8:00 pm, ESPN+		at Chattanooga	W 80–75	16–12 (9–7)	McKenzie Arena (3,651); Chattanooga, TN
February 23, 2022; 7:00 pm, ESPN+		Wofford	L 72–83	16–13 (9–8)	Cameron Hall (1,067); Lexington, VA
February 26, 2022; 7:00 pm, ESPN+		at Western Carolina	L 73–82	16–14 (9–9)	Ramsey Center (2,026); Cullowhee, NC
SoCon tournament
March 5, 2022; 2:30 pm, ESPN+	(5)	vs. (4) Wofford; Quarterfinals	L 66–68	16–15	Harrah's Cherokee Center; Asheville, NC
CBI
March 20, 2022; 12:00 pm, FloHoops	(8)	vs. (9) UNC Wilmington; First Round	L 78–93	16–16	Ocean Center; Daytona Beach, FL
*Non-conference game. ^{#}Rankings from AP Poll. (#) Tournament seedings in parentheses. All times are in Eastern.

== Post Season Awards ==
- Jake Stephens (1st Team All-SoCon)
- Kamdyn Curfman (3rd Team All-SoCon)
- Trey Bonham (3rd Team All-SoCon)
- Jake Stephens (2nd Team All-SoCon Tournament)
- Honor Huff (All SoCon Freshmen Team)
