= 2021–22 Chattanooga Mocs men's basketball team =

American college basketball season

2021–22 Chattanooga Mocs men's basketball

SoCon regular-season and tournament champions

NCAA tournament, first round
- Conference: Southern Conference
- Record: 27–8 (14–4 SoCon)
- Head coach: Lamont Paris (5th season)
- Assistant coaches: Tanner Bronson; Eddie Shannon; David McKinley
- Home arena: McKenzie Arena

2021–22 Southern Conference men's basketball standings
	Conf.				Overall
Team	W		L	PCT	W		L	PCT
Chattanooga †	14	–	4	.778	27	–	8	.771
Furman	12	–	6	.667	22	–	12	.647
Samford	10	–	8	.556	21	–	11	.656
Wofford	10	–	8	.556	19	–	13	.594
VMI	9	–	9	.500	16	–	16	.500
UNC Greensboro	9	–	9	.500	17	–	15	.531
Mercer	8	–	10	.444	16	–	17	.485
East Tennessee State	7	–	11	.389	15	–	17	.469
The Citadel	6	–	12	.333	13	–	17	.433
Western Carolina	5	–	13	.278	11	–	21	.344
† 2022 SoCon Tournament winner

The 2021–22 Chattanooga Mocs men's basketball team represented the University of Tennessee at Chattanooga in the 2021–22 NCAA Division I men's basketball season. The Mocs, led by fifth-year head coach Lamont Paris, played their home games at McKenzie Arena in Chattanooga, Tennessee as members of the Southern Conference (SoCon).

The Mocs finished the season 27–8, 14–4 in SoCon play, to win the SoCon regular-season championship. As the No. 1 seed in the SoCon tournament, they defeated The Citadel, Wofford and Furman to win the tournament championship. As a result, they received the conference's automatic bid to the NCAA tournament as the No. 13 seed in the South Region, where they lost in the first round to Illinois.

== Previous season ==
In a 2020–21 season limited due to the ongoing COVID-19 pandemic, the Mocs finished the season 18–8, 9–7 in SoCon play, to finish in fourth place. They lost to East Tennessee State in the quarterfinals of the SoCon tournament.

== Roster ==
2021–22 Chattanooga Mocs men's basketball team
Players
Coaches

Pos.	#	Name	Height	Weight	Year	Hometown
G	0	A. J. Caldwell	6 ft 5 in (1.96 m)	200 lb (91 kg)	RS Sr	Sarasota, FL
F	1	KC Hankton	6 ft 7 in (2.01 m)	215 lb (98 kg)	Sr	Charlotte, NC
G	2	Jamaal Walker	6 ft 5 in (1.96 m)	194 lb (88 kg)	RS So	Chattanooga, TN
G	3	David Jean-Baptiste	6 ft 1 in (1.85 m)	195 lb (88 kg)	GS	Miami, FL
G	4	Tada Stricklen	5 ft 11 in (1.8 m)	162 lb (73 kg)	RS Jr	Corinth, MS
F	5	Darius Banks	6 ft 6 in (1.98 m)	215 lb (98 kg)	GS	St. Petersburg, FL
G	11	Ashton Smith	5 ft 8 in (1.73 m)	163 lb (74 kg)	RS So	Memphis, TN
G	12	Johnny Jr. Taylor	6 ft 3 in (1.91 m)	184 lb (83 kg)	Fr	Ocoee, FL
G	13	Malachi Smith	6 ft 4 in (1.93 m)	205 lb (93 kg)	RS Jr	Belleville, IL
F	20	Jacob Radaker	6 ft 9 in (2.06 m)	222 lb (101 kg)	Fr	Jefferson, GA
F	21	Josh Ayeni	6 ft 7 in (2.01 m)	215 lb (98 kg)	GS	Zaria, Nigeria
F	22	Silvio De Sousa	6 ft 9 in (2.06 m)	250 lb (113 kg)	GS	Luanda, Angola
C	23	Avery Diggs	6 ft 10 in (2.08 m)	255 lb (116 kg)	GS	Brandon, FL
F	25	Jaden Frazier	6 ft 9 in (2.06 m)	215 lb (98 kg)	RS So	Pulaski, VA
G/F	34	Randy Brady	6 ft 5 in (1.96 m)	215 lb (98 kg)	Fr	Chattanooga, TN
G/F	35	Grant Ledford	6 ft 5 in (1.96 m)	215 lb (98 kg)	RS So	Knoxville, TN

Head coach

- Lamont Paris (Wooster)

Assistant coach(es)

- Tanner Bronson (Wisconsin)
- Eddie Shannon (Florida)
- David McKinley (Ohio)

Legend

- (C) Team captain
- (S) Suspended
- (I) Ineligible
- (W) Walk-on
- Injured
- Current redshirt

Roster
Last update: September 28, 2024

== Schedule and results ==
Date time, TV	Rank^{#}	Opponent^{#}	Result	Record	Site (attendance) city, state
Exhibition
October 26, 2021*; 7:00 p.m.		Wooster	W 94–60		McKenzie Arena (2,019); Chattanooga, TN
Non-conference regular season
November 9, 2021*; 10:00 p.m.		at Loyola Marymount	W 75–64	1–0	Gersten Pavilion (1,503); Los Angeles, CA
November 14, 2021*; 2:00 p.m., ESPN+		UNC Asheville; Coke Zero Classic	W 75–45	2–0	McKenzie Arena (2,250); Chattanooga, TN
November 16, 2021*; 7:00 p.m., ESPN+		Tennessee Tech; Coke Zero Classic	W 69–62	3–0	McKenzie Arena (2,701); Chattanooga, TN
November 20, 2021*; 4:00 p.m., ESPN+		at VCU	W 56–54	4–0	Siegel Center (7,202); Richmond, VA
November 23, 2021*; 11:00 a.m., ESPN+		Covenant	W 100–39	5–0	McKenzie Arena (8,910); Chattanooga, TN
November 27, 2021*; 4:00 p.m., ESPN+		College of Charleston	L 66–68	5–1	McKenzie Arena (2,244); Chattanooga, TN
November 30, 2021*; 7:00 p.m., ESPN+		at Tennessee Tech	W 82–65	6–1	Eblen Center (802); Cookeville, TN
December 5, 2021*; 6:30 p.m., ESPN+		at Lipscomb	W 85–64	7–1	Allen Arena (2,081); Nashville, TN
December 8, 2021*; 6:30 p.m., ESPN+		at UNC Asheville	W 78–73	8–1	Kimmel Arena (405); Asheville, NC
December 12, 2021*; 2:00 p.m., ESPN+		Tennessee Wesleyan	W 104–55	9–1	McKenzie Arena (2,469); Chattanooga, TN
December 15, 2021*; 6:00 p.m., ESPN+		at Belmont	L 68–76	9–2	Curb Event Center (2,075); Nashville, TN
December 18, 2021*; 8:00 p.m., ESPN+		at Murray State	L 76–87	9–3	Allen Arena (3,791); Murray, KY
December 22, 2021*; 7:00 p.m., ESPN+		Middle Tennessee	W 77–65	10–3	McKenzie Arena (2,730); Chattanooga, TN
SoCon regular season
December 30, 2021; 7:00 p.m., ESPNU		East Tennessee State	W 82–52	11–3 (1–0)	McKenzie Arena (3,025); Chattanooga, TN
January 5, 2022; 7:00 p.m., ESPN+		at Wofford	W 75–67	12–3 (2–0)	Jerry Richardson Indoor Stadium (992); Spartanburg, SC
January 8, 2022; 4:00 p.m., ESPN+		The Citadel	W 85–67	13–3 (3–0)	McKenzie Arena (2,284); Chattanooga, TN
January 12, 2022; 7:00 p.m., ESPN+		at Western Carolina	L 59–70	13–4 (3–1)	Ramsey Center (2,749); Cullowhee, NC
January 15, 2022; 3:00 p.m., CBSSN		Furman	W 71–69	14–4 (4–1)	McKenzie Arena (3,607); Chattanooga, TN
January 20, 2022; 7:00 p.m., ESPN+		at UNC Greensboro	W 72–64	15–4 (5–1)	Greensboro Coliseum (1,749); Greensboro, NC
January 22, 2022; 1:00 p.m., ESPN+		at VMI	W 78–74	16–4 (6–1)	Cameron Hall (2,345); Lexington, VA
January 26, 2022; 7:00 p.m., ESPN+		Wofford	W 71–60	17–4 (7–1)	McKenzie Arena (3,211); Chattanooga, TN
January 29, 2022; 1:00 p.m., ESPN+		at The Citadel	W 75–62	18–4 (8–1)	McAlister Field House (1,003); Charleston, SC
February 2, 2022; 8:00 p.m., ESPN+		at Samford	L 72–80	18–5 (8–2)	Pete Hanna Center (1,465); Homewood, AL
February 5, 2022; 12:00 p.m., ESPNU		Mercer	W 77–68	19–5 (9–2)	McKenzie Arena (3,192); Chattanooga, TN
February 7, 2022; 7:00 p.m., ESPN+		at Mercer; Rescheduled from January 1	W 74–72 ^{OT}	20–5 (10–2)	Hawkins Arena (1,826); Macon, GA
February 9, 2022; 7:00 p.m., ESPN+		Western Carolina	W 65–47	21–5 (11–2)	McKenzie Arena (3,128); Chattanooga, TN
February 12, 2022; 2:00 p.m., ESPN+		at Furman	W 64–58	22–5 (12–2)	Timmons Arena (2,502); Greenville, SC
February 17, 2022; 7:00 p.m., ESPN+		UNC Greensboro	L 70–73	22–6 (12–3)	McKenzie Arena (3,101); Chattanooga, TN
February 19, 2022; 4:00 p.m., ESPN+		VMI	L 75–80	22–7 (12–4)	McKenzie Arena (3,651); Chattanooga, TN
February 23, 2022; 7:00 p.m., ESPN+		at East Tennessee State	W 83–77	23–7 (13–4)	Freedom Hall Civic Center (4,610); Johnson City, TN
February 26, 2022; 4:00 p.m., ESPN+		Samford	W 70–57	24–7 (14–4)	McKenzie Arena (4,015); Chattanooga, TN
SoCon tournament
March 5, 2022; 12:00 p.m., ESPN+	(1)	vs. (9) The Citadel; Quarterfinals	W 71–66	25–7	Harrah's Cherokee Center; Asheville, NC
March 6, 2022; 4:00 p.m., ESPNU	(1)	vs. (4) Wofford; Semifinals	W 79–56	26–7	Harrah's Cherokee Center; Asheville, NC
March 7, 2022; 7:00 p.m., ESPN	(1)	vs. (2) Furman; Championship	W 64–63 ^{OT}	27–7	Harrah's Cherokee Center; Asheville, NC
NCAA tournament
March 18, 2022; 6:50 p.m., TNT	(13 S)	vs. (4 S) No. 19 Illinois; First round	L 53–54	27–8	PPG Paints Arena (17,410); Pittsburgh, PA
*Non-conference game. ^{#}Rankings from AP poll. (#) Tournament seedings in parentheses. All times are in Eastern.
