= 2021–22 Samford Bulldogs men's basketball team =

American college basketball season

2021–22 Samford Bulldogs men's basketball
- Conference: Southern Conference
- Record: 21–11 (10–8 SoCon)
- Head coach: Bucky McMillan (2nd season)
- Associate head coach: Mitch Cole
- Assistant coaches: Zach Gillion; Neb Exantus
- Home arena: Pete Hanna Center

2021–22 Southern Conference men's basketball standings
	Conf.				Overall
Team	W		L	PCT	W		L	PCT
Chattanooga †	14	–	4	.778	27	–	8	.771
Furman	12	–	6	.667	22	–	12	.647
Samford	10	–	8	.556	21	–	11	.656
Wofford	10	–	8	.556	19	–	13	.594
VMI	9	–	9	.500	16	–	16	.500
UNC Greensboro	9	–	9	.500	17	–	15	.531
Mercer	8	–	10	.444	16	–	17	.485
East Tennessee State	7	–	11	.389	15	–	17	.469
The Citadel	6	–	12	.333	13	–	17	.433
Western Carolina	5	–	13	.278	11	–	21	.344
† 2022 SoCon Tournament winner

The 2021–22 Samford Bulldogs men's basketball team represented Samford University in the 2021–22 NCAA Division I men's basketball season. The Bulldogs, led by second-year head coach Bucky McMillan, played their home games at the Pete Hanna Center in Homewood, Alabama as a member of the Southern Conference. They finished the season 21–11, 10–8 in SoCon play to finish in a tie for third place. As the No. 3 seed in the SoCon tournament, they defeated UNC Greensboro before losing to Furman in the semifinals.

== Previous season ==
In a season limited due to the ongoing COVID-19 pandemic, the Bulldogs finished the 2020–21 season 6–13, 2–9 in SoCon play to finish in last place. They lost to Mercer in the first round of the SoCon tournament.

== Roster ==
2021–22 Samford Bulldogs men's basketball team
Players
Coaches

Pos.	#	Name	Height	Weight	Year	Hometown
G	0	Ques Glover	6 ft 0 in (1.83 m)	180 lb (82 kg)	So	Knoxville, TN
G	1	Wesley Cardet	6 ft 6 in (1.98 m)	210 lb (95 kg)	Fr	Fort Lauderdale, FL
G	2	Jaden Campbell	6 ft 5 in (1.96 m)	205 lb (93 kg)	So	Brampton, Ontario
G	3	Jaron Rillie	6 ft 3 in (1.91 m)	175 lb (79 kg)	Fr	Sydney, Australia
F	4	Jermaine Marshall	6 ft 6 in (1.98 m)	225 lb (102 kg)	So	Brighton, AL
G	5	A.J. Staton-McCray	6 ft 5 in (1.96 m)	190 lb (86 kg)	Fr	Delray Beach, FL
G/F	10	Angel Smith	6 ft 5 in (1.96 m)	195 lb (88 kg)	Fr	Fort Lauderdale, FL
G	11	Marcellus Vail	6 ft 2 in (1.88 m)	195 lb (88 kg)	Fr	Shelbyville, KY
G	12	Clay Holmes	6 ft 2 in (1.88 m)	235 lb (107 kg)	Fr	Brentwood, TN
G	13	Quinn Richey	6 ft 5 in (1.96 m)	205 lb (93 kg)	So	Johns Creek, GA
G	14	Richardson Maitre	6 ft 3 in (1.91 m)	180 lb (82 kg)	Sr	Port-au-Prince, Haiti
F	15	Grayson Walters	6 ft 5 in (1.96 m)	210 lb (95 kg)	Fr	Mountain Brook, AL
G	21	Owen LaRocca	6 ft 1 in (1.85 m)	150 lb (68 kg)	Fr	Sugar Land, TX
F	22	Logan Dye	6 ft 9 in (2.06 m)	240 lb (109 kg)	Jr	Haleyville, AL
G	23	Cooper Kaifes	6 ft 4 in (1.93 m)	205 lb (93 kg)	RS So	Shawnee, KS
F	24	Daniel Lobach	6 ft 7 in (2.01 m)	190 lb (86 kg)	RS Fr	Durham, NC
F	31	Bryan Smith	6 ft 4 in (1.93 m)	190 lb (86 kg)	So	Pismo Beach, CA
G	33	Charlie Morrison	6 ft 0 in (1.83 m)	190 lb (86 kg)	So	Athens, AL
G	35	Paulie Stramaglia	5 ft 11 in (1.8 m)	180 lb (82 kg)	Fr	Mountain Brook, AL
C	42	Jacob Tryon	6 ft 11 in (2.11 m)	220 lb (100 kg)	Sr	Temecula, CA

Head coach

- Bucky McMillan (Birmingham–Southern)

Assistant coach(es)

- Mitch Cole (Montana State Billings)
- Zach Gillion
- Neb Exantus (Southern New Hampshire)

Legend

- (C) Team captain
- (S) Suspended
- (I) Ineligible
- (W) Walk-on
- Injured
- Current redshirt

Roster
Last update: November 26, 2021

== Schedule and results ==
Date time, TV	Rank^{#}	Opponent^{#}	Result	Record	High points	High rebounds	High assists	Site (attendance) city, state
Non-conference regular season
November 9, 2021*; 7:00 pm, ESPN+		Maryville	W 99–78	1–0	19 – Glover	12 – Tryon	5 – Vail	Pete Hanna Center (903); Homewood, AL
November 11, 2021*; 7:00 pm, ESPN+		Spring Hill	W 86–69	2–0	16 – Marshall	10 – Marshall	4 – Glover	Pete Hanna Center (1,101); Homewood, AL
November 15, 2021*; 8:00 pm, WCC+		at San Francisco	L 55–77	2–1	24 – Glover	7 – Marshall	2 – Marshall	War Memorial Gymnasium (1,033); San Francisco, CA
November 18, 2021*; 8:00 pm, P12N+		at Oregon State	W 78–77	3–1	16 – Glover	6 – 2 Tied	9 – Glover	Gill Coliseum (3,491); Corvallis, OR
November 26, 2021*; 1:30 pm		vs. North Carolina A&T; Emerald Coast Classic Second Round	W 77–75	4–1	25 – Glover	13 – Marshall	7 – Glover	The Arena at NWFSC (200); Niceville, FL
November 27, 2021*; 12:30 pm		vs. McNeese State; Emerald Coast Classic Championship/Consolation	W 83–75	5–1	24 – Glover	12 – Marshall	6 – Glover	The Arena at NWFSC (125); Niceville, FL
November 30, 2021*; 7:00 pm, ESPN+		Mississippi College	W 83–58	6–1	16 – Tryon	6 – 2 Tied	7 – Rillie	Pete Hanna Center (1,113); Homewood, AL
December 5, 2021*; 2:00 pm, ESPN+		Belmont	L 73–85	6–2	22 – 2 Tied	13 – Marshall	6 – Glover	Pete Hanna Center (2,876); Homewood, AL
December 8, 2021*; 7:00 pm		at Alabama State	W 74–64	7–2	27 – Cardet	13 – Marshall	3 – Rillie	Dunn–Oliver Acadome (175); Montgomery, AL
December 11, 2021*; 6:00 pm, ESPN+		Alabama A&M	W 52–50	8–2	12 – Marshall	14 – Marshall	4 – Campbell	Pete Hanna Center (1,841); Homewood, AL
December 18, 2021*; 6:00 pm, ESPN+		Kennesaw State	W 85–84	9–2	22 – Glover	5 – Marshall	4 – Campbell	Pete Hanna Center (713); Homewood, AL
December 21, 2021*; 3:00 pm, SECN+		at Ole Miss	W 75–73	10–2	21 – Glover	11 – Marshall	4 – Rillie	SJB Pavilion (5,649); Oxford, MS
SoCon regular season
December 29, 2021; 6:00 pm, ESPN+		at Furman	L 49–81	10–3 (0–1)	15 – Campbell	7 – Cardet	2 – Rillie	Timmons Arena (1,527); Greenville, SC
January 5, 2022; 6:00 pm, ESPN+		at Mercer	L 80–83	10–4 (0–2)	24 – Marshall	9 – 2 Tied	6 – Glover	Hawkins Arena (1,082); Macon, GA
January 8, 2022; 4:00 pm, ESPN+		Western Carolina	W 85–60	11–4 (1–2)	18 – Cardet	11 – Marshall	5 – Glover	Pete Hanna Center (703); Homewood, AL
January 12, 2022; 6:00 pm, ESPN+		at Wofford	L 64–87	11–5 (1–3)	16 – Campbell	6 – Cardet	3 – Glover	Jerry Richardson Indoor Stadium (979); Spartanburg, SC
January 15, 2022; 2:00 pm, ESPN+		East Tennessee State	L 85–88	11–6 (1–4)	20 – 2 Tied	9 – Cardet	8 – Glover	Pete Hanna Center (1,034); Homewood, AL
January 20, 2022; 6:00 pm, ESPN+		at VMI	L 80–99	11–7 (1–5)	19 – Dye	8 – Dye	3 – 2 Tied	Cameron Hall (826); Lexington, VA
January 22, 2022; 4:00 pm, ESPN+		at UNC Greensboro	L 58–61	11–8 (1–6)	14 – 2 Tied	11 – Cardet	2 – 2 Tied	Greensboro Coliseum (1,462); Greensboro, NC
January 26, 2022; 7:00 pm, ESPN+		Mercer	W 75–61	12–8 (2–6)	20 – Glover	6 – Rillie	5 – Glover	Pete Hanna Center (891); Homewood, AL
January 29, 2022; 2:00 pm		at Western Carolina	W 74–64	13–8 (3–6)	18 – Marshall	7 – Marshall	3 – Tied	Ramsey Center (1,381); Cullowhee, NC
February 2, 2022; 7:00 pm, ESPN+		Chattanooga	W 80–72	14–8 (4–6)	20 – Glover	11 – Dye	5 – Glover	Pete Hanna Center (1,465); Homewood, AL
February 5, 2022; 12:00 pm, ESPN+		at The Citadel	L 93–107	14–9 (4–7)	30 – Glover	8 – Marshall	5 – Glover	McAlister Field House (1,137); Charleston, SC
February 9, 2022; 7:00 pm, ESPN+		Wofford	W 65–60 ^{OT}	15–9 (5–7)	18 – Glover	10 – Marshall	3 – Tied	Pete Hanna Center (1,343); Homewood, AL
February 12, 2022; 4:00 pm, ESPN+		at East Tennessee State	W 77–73	16–9 (6–7)	23 – Glover	10 – Marshall	2 – Tied	Freedom Hall Civic Center (4,502); Johnson City, TN
February 17, 2022; 7:00 pm, ESPN+		VMI	W 100–99 ^{OT}	17–9 (7–7)	26 – Glover	7 – Dye	10 – Glover	Pete Hanna Center (1,013); Homewood, AL
February 19, 2022; 2:00 pm, ESPN+		UNC Greensboro	W 55–49	16–12 (8–7)	20 – Glover	11 – Marshall	3 – Glover	Pete Hanna Center (1,310); Homewood, AL
February 21, 2022; 8:00 pm, ESPN+		The Citadel; Rescheduled from Jan. 1	W 76–74	19–9 (9–7)	26 – Glover	11 – Dye	5 – Glover	Pete Hanna Center (1,632); Homewood, AL
February 23, 2022; 7:00 pm, ESPN+		Furman	W 83–75	20–9 (10–7)	22 – Glover	9 – Marshall	6 – Glover	Pete Hanna Center (2,512); Homewood, AL
February 26, 2022; 3:00 pm, ESPN+		at Chattanooga	L 57–70	20–10 (10–8)	17 – Marshall	8 – Marshall	2 – Glover	McKenzie Arena (4,015); Chattanooga, TN
SoCon tournament
March 5, 2022; 8:00 pm, ESPN+	(3)	vs. (6) UNC Greensboro; Quarterfinals	W 66–64	21–10	19 – Dye	8 – Dye	7 – Glover	Harrah's Cherokee Center (3,032); Asheville, NC
March 6, 2022; 6:30 pm, ESPNU	(3)	vs. (2) Furman; Semifinals	L 68–71	21–11	23 – Glover	12 – Marshall	4 – Glover	Harrah's Cherokee Center (3,027); Asheville, NC
*Non-conference game. ^{#}Rankings from AP Poll. (#) Tournament seedings in parentheses. All times are in Eastern.
