= 2021–22 Furman Paladins men's basketball team =

American college basketball season

2021–22 Furman Paladins men's basketball
- Conference: Southern Conference
- Record: 22–12 (12–6 SoCon)
- Head coach: Bob Richey (5th season)
- Associate head coach: Jeremy Growe
- Assistant coaches: Jimmie Williams; Tim Johnson
- Home arena: Timmons Arena; Bon Secours Wellness Arena

2021–22 Southern Conference men's basketball standings
	Conf.				Overall
Team	W		L	PCT	W		L	PCT
Chattanooga †	14	–	4	.778	27	–	8	.771
Furman	12	–	6	.667	22	–	12	.647
Samford	10	–	8	.556	21	–	11	.656
Wofford	10	–	8	.556	19	–	13	.594
VMI	9	–	9	.500	16	–	16	.500
UNC Greensboro	9	–	9	.500	17	–	15	.531
Mercer	8	–	10	.444	16	–	17	.485
East Tennessee State	7	–	11	.389	15	–	17	.469
The Citadel	6	–	12	.333	13	–	17	.433
Western Carolina	5	–	13	.278	11	–	21	.344
† 2022 SoCon Tournament winner

The 2021–22 Furman Paladins men's basketball team represented Furman University in the 2021–22 NCAA Division I men's basketball season. The Paladins, led by fifth-year head coach Bob Richey, played their home games at Timmons Arena and Bon Secours Wellness Arena in Greenville, South Carolina as members of the Southern Conference. They finished the regular season 20–11, 12–6 in SoCon play to finish second place. They defeated Mercer and Samford in the SoCon tournament to advance to the championship game. There they lost to Chattanooga in overtime.

== Previous season ==
In a season limited due to the ongoing COVID-19 pandemic, the Paladins finished the 2020–21 season 16–9, 10–5 in SoCon play to finish in third place. They were upset in overtime in quarterfinals of the SoCon tournament by VMI.

== Roster ==
2021–22 Furman Paladins men's basketball team
Players
Coaches

Pos.	#	Name	Height	Weight	Year	Hometown
G	0	JP Pegues	6 ft 1 in (1.85 m)	165 lb (75 kg)	Fr	Nashville, Tennessee
G	1	Jaylon Pugh	6 ft 0 in (1.83 m)	173 lb (78 kg)	Sr	Cartersville, Georgia
G	2	Colin Kenney	6 ft 1 in (1.85 m)	172 lb (78 kg)	Jr	Michigan City, Indiana
G	3	Mike Bothwell	6 ft 3 in (1.91 m)	195 lb (88 kg)	Sr	Cleveland Heights, Ohio
G	5	Marcus Foster	6 ft 4 in (1.93 m)	210 lb (95 kg)	RS So	Atlanta, Georgia
G	10	Alex Hunter	5 ft 11 in (1.8 m)	180 lb (82 kg)	RS Sr	Raleigh, North Carolina
G	11	Robert Swanson	5 ft 10 in (1.78 m)	165 lb (75 kg)	Sr	Myrtle Beach, South Carolina
F	12	Jonny Lawrence	6 ft 10 in (2.08 m)	205 lb (93 kg)	RS So	Orlando, Florida
F	13	Garrett Hien	6 ft 9 in (2.06 m)	205 lb (93 kg)	So	Charlotte, North Carolina
G	14	Rett Lister	6 ft 1 in (1.85 m)	167 lb (76 kg)	Jr	Easley, South Carolina
F	15	Tyrese Hughey	6 ft 6 in (1.98 m)	210 lb (95 kg)	Fr	Columbus, Ohio
F	20	Jalen Slawson	6 ft 7 in (2.01 m)	218 lb (99 kg)	Sr	Summerville, South Carolina
F	21	Ben Beeker	6 ft 9 in (2.06 m)	225 lb (102 kg)	Jr	Hendersonville, North Carolina
G	22	Joe Anderson	6 ft 0 in (1.83 m)	170 lb (77 kg)	So	Maryville, Tennessee
F	24	Alex Williams	6 ft 5 in (1.96 m)	205 lb (93 kg)	Fr	Xenia, Ohio
F	35	James Repass	6 ft 10 in (2.08 m)	250 lb (113 kg)	Fr	Jacksonville, Florida
G	51	Conley Garrison	6 ft 1 in (1.85 m)	170 lb (77 kg)	GS	Bolivar, Missouri

Head coach

- Bob Richey (North Greenville)

Assistant coach(es)

- Jeremy Growe (Indiana)
- Jimmie Williams (MNU)
- Tim Johnson (Wofford)

Legend

- (C) Team captain
- (S) Suspended
- (I) Ineligible
- (W) Walk-on
- Injured
- Current redshirt

Roster
Last update: November 23, 2021

== Schedule and results ==
Date time, TV	Rank^{#}	Opponent^{#}	Result	Record	Site (attendance) city, state
Non-conference regular season
November 9, 2021*; 7:00 pm, ESPN+		North Greenville	W 118–66	1–0	Timmons Arena (1,611); Greenville, SC
November 12, 2021*; 7:00 pm, ACCNX		at Louisville	W 80–72 ^{OT}	2–0	KFC Yum! Center (12,431); Louisville, KY
November 15, 2021*; 7:30 pm, ESPN+		at Belmont	L 89–95 ^{OT}	2–1	Curb Event Center (1,727); Nashville, TN
November 19, 2021*; 7:00 pm, ESPN+		Radford	W 81–64	3–1	Timmons Arena (1,658); Greenville, SC
November 21, 2021*; 3:00 pm, ESPN+		Navy	L 66–77	3–2	Timmons Arena (1,701); Greenville, SC
November 27, 2021*; 4:00 pm, ESPN+		at USC Upstate	W 87–77	4–2	G. B. Hodge Center (449); Spartanburg, SC
November 30, 2021*; 7:00 pm, ESPN+		at High Point	W 74–70 ^{2OT}	5–2	Qubein Center (2,711); High Point, NC
December 3, 2021*; 3:00 pm, ESPN+		College of Charleston	W 91–88 ^{OT}	6–2	Timmons Arena (2,015); Greenville, SC
December 7, 2021*; 7:00 pm, ESPN+		at Winthrop	L 80–85	6–3	Winthrop Coliseum (920); Rock Hill, SC
December 10, 2021*; 7:00 pm, ESPN+		Appalachian State	W 73–65	7–3	Timmons Arena (1,978); Greenville, SC
December 14, 2021*; 7:00 pm, ESPN2		at North Carolina	L 61–74	7–4	Dean Smith Center (14,342); Chapel Hill, NC
December 17, 2021*; 7:00 pm, SECN		at Mississippi State	L 66-69	7-5	Humphrey Coliseum (5797); Starkville, MS
December 21, 2021*; 7:00 pm, ESPN+		Presbyterian	W 75–61	8–5	Timmons Arena (1,947); Greenville, SC
SoCon regular season
December 29, 2021; 7:00 pm, ESPN+		Samford	W 81–49	9–5 (1–0)	Timmons Arena (1,527); Greenville, SC
January 1, 2022; 1:00 pm, ESPN+		at VMI	L 67–76	9–6 (1–1)	Cameron Hall (650); Lexington, VA
January 5, 2022; 7:00 pm, ESPNews		at UNC Greensboro	W 58–54	10–6 (2–1)	Greensboro Coliseum (1,537); Greensboro, NC
January 8, 2022; 4:00 pm, ESPN+		Mercer	W 81–66	11–6 (3–1)	Bon Secours Wellness Arena (3,217); Greenville, SC
January 12, 2022; 7:00 pm, ESPN+		East Tennessee State	W 78–69	12–6 (4–1)	Timmons Arena (1,532); Greenville, SC
January 15, 2022; 3:00 pm, CBSSN		at Chattanooga	L 69–71	12–7 (4–2)	McKenzie Arena (3,607); Chattanooga, TN
January 19, 2022; 7:00 pm, ESPN+		Western Carolina	W 88–50	13–7 (5–2)	Timmons Arena (1,464); Greenville, SC
January 22, 2022; 7:00 pm, ESPN+		at Wofford	W 75–50	14–7 (6–2)	Jerry Richardson Indoor Stadium (2,857); Spartanburg, SC
January 26, 2022; 7:00 pm, ESPN+		VMI	W 79–64	15–7 (7–2)	Timmons Arena (1,464); Greenville, SC
January 29, 2022; 6:00 pm, ESPN+		at Mercer	W 80–50	16–7 (8–2)	Hawkins Arena (3,572); Macon, GA
February 2, 2022; 7:00 pm, ESPN+		The Citadel	W 102–83	17–7 (9–2)	Timmons Arena (1,749); Greenville, SC
February 5, 2022; 12:00 pm, ESPN+		UNC Greensboro	L 56–58	17–8 (9–3)	Bon Secours Wellness Arena (3,616); Greenville, SC
February 7, 2022; 7:00 pm, ESPNU		at East Tennessee State	L 71–75	17–9 (9–4)	Freedom Hall Civic Center (4,324); Johnson City, TN
February 12, 2022; 4:00 pm, ESPN+		Chattanooga	L 58–64	17–10 (9–5)	Timmons Arena (2,502); Greenville, SC
February 16, 2022; 7:00 pm, ESPN+		at Western Carolina	W 103–85	18–10 (10–5)	Ramsey Center (1,209); Cullowhee, NC
February 19, 2022; 12:00 pm, ESPN+		Wofford	W 70–69	19–10 (11–5)	Bon Secours Wellness Arena (5,332); Greenville, SC
February 23, 2022; 8:00 pm, ESPN+		at Samford	L 75–83	19–11 (11–6)	Pete Hanna Center (2,512); Homewood, AL
February 26, 2022; 1:00 pm, ESPN+		at The Citadel	W 94–59	20–11 (12–6)	McAlister Field House (2,573); Charleston, SC
SoCon tournament
March 5, 2022; 6:00 pm, ESPN+	(2)	vs. (7) Mercer; Quarterfinals	W 80–66	21–11	Harrah's Cherokee Center; Asheville, NC
March 6, 2022; 6:30 pm, ESPNU	(2)	vs. (3) Samford; Semifinals	W 71–68	22–11	Harrah's Cherokee Center (3,027); Asheville, NC
March 7, 2022; 7:00 pm, ESPN	(2)	vs. (1) Chattanooga; Championship	L 63–64 ^{OT}	22–12	Harrah's Cherokee Center (5,032); Asheville, NC
*Non-conference game. ^{#}Rankings from AP Poll. (#) Tournament seedings in parentheses. All times are in Eastern.
