= 2021–22 East Tennessee State Buccaneers men's basketball team =

American college basketball season

2021–22 East Tennessee State Buccaneers men's basketball
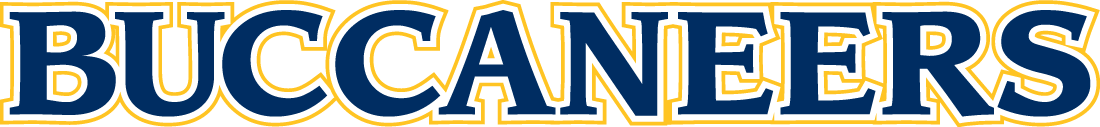

Naples Invitational champion
- Conference: Southern Conference
- Record: 15–17 (7–11 SoCon)
- Head coach: Desmond Oliver (1st season)
- Assistant coaches: Mark Bialkoski; Patrice Days; Mantoris Robinson
- Home arena: Freedom Hall Civic Center

2021–22 Southern Conference men's basketball standings
	Conf.				Overall
Team	W		L	PCT	W		L	PCT
Chattanooga †	14	–	4	.778	27	–	8	.771
Furman	12	–	6	.667	22	–	12	.647
Samford	10	–	8	.556	21	–	11	.656
Wofford	10	–	8	.556	19	–	13	.594
VMI	9	–	9	.500	16	–	16	.500
UNC Greensboro	9	–	9	.500	17	–	15	.531
Mercer	8	–	10	.444	16	–	17	.485
East Tennessee State	7	–	11	.389	15	–	17	.469
The Citadel	6	–	12	.333	13	–	17	.433
Western Carolina	5	–	13	.278	11	–	21	.344
† 2022 SoCon Tournament winner

The 2021–22 East Tennessee State Buccaneers men's basketball team represented East Tennessee State University (ETSU) in the 2021–22 NCAA Division I men's basketball season. The Buccaneers, led by first-year head coach Desmond Oliver, played their home games at the Freedom Hall Civic Center in Johnson City, Tennessee, as members of the Southern Conference (SoCon). They finished the season 15–17, 7–11 in SoCon play, to finish in eighth place. They lost to The Citadel in the first round of the SoCon tournament.

== Previous season ==
In a season limited due to the ongoing COVID-19 pandemic, the Buccaneers finished the 2020–21 season 13–12 overall, 8–7 in SoCon play, to finish in fifth place. In the SoCon tournament, they defeated Chattanooga in the quarterfinals, before losing to UNC Greensboro in the semifinals.

On March 30, 2021, Jason Shay resigned after one season as head coach following his support of his players kneeling during the national anthem as protest of social injustice. He joined former ETSU head coach Steve Forbes as an assistant coach at Wake Forest. On April 5, the school named Tennessee assistant coach Desmond Oliver as the team's new head coach.

== Roster ==
2021–22 East Tennessee State Buccaneers men's basketball team
Players
Coaches

Pos.	#	Name	Height	Weight	Year	Hometown
G	1	Mohab Yasser	6 ft 5 in (1.96 m)	183 lb (83 kg)	Fr	Giza, Egypt
G	2	Jordan King	6 ft 0 in (1.83 m)	172 lb (78 kg)	So	Albany, NY
G	4	David Sloan	6 ft 0 in (1.83 m)	180 lb (82 kg)	Sr	Louisville, KY
G	5	Allen Strothers	6 ft 1 in (1.85 m)	167 lb (76 kg)	Fr	Newport News, VA
G	11	Brandon Hall	6 ft 3 in (1.91 m)	191 lb (87 kg)	Fr	Chicago, IL
F	14	Ty Brewer	6 ft 9 in (2.06 m)	205 lb (93 kg)	Jr	Meridian, MS
G	15	Cameron George	6 ft 3 in (1.91 m)	184 lb (83 kg)	Fr	Knoxville, TN
F	20	Kordell Charles	6 ft 8 in (2.03 m)	200 lb (91 kg)	Fr	Ontario, Canada
C	21	Matt Nunez	6 ft 10 in (2.08 m)	246 lb (112 kg)	Fr	Newport News, VA
F	22	Jaden Seymour	6 ft 8 in (2.03 m)	191 lb (87 kg)	Fr	Charlotte, NC
F	23	Vonnie Patterson	6 ft 4 in (1.93 m)	200 lb (91 kg)	Sr	Louisville, KY
F	24	Isaac Farah	6 ft 7 in (2.01 m)	208 lb (94 kg)	Fr	Fishers, IN
G	25	Ledarrius Brewer	6 ft 5 in (1.96 m)	190 lb (86 kg)	RS Jr	Meridian, MS
F	33	Charlie Weber	6 ft 9 in (2.06 m)	215 lb (98 kg)	So	Owings, MD

Head coach

- Desmond Oliver (Dominican (NY))

Assistant coach(es)

- Mark Bialkoski (Georgia Southern)
- Patrice Days (New Orleans)
- Mantoris Robinson (Winthrop)

Legend

- (C) Team captain
- (S) Suspended
- (I) Ineligible
- (W) Walk-on
- Injured
- Current redshirt

Roster
Last update: July 21, 2024

== Schedule and results ==
Date time, TV	Rank^{#}	Opponent^{#}	Result	Record	Site (attendance) city, state
Exhibition
November 5, 2021*; 7:00 p.m.		Catawba	W 91–58		Freedom Hall Civic Center (2,701); Johnson City, TN
Non-conference Regular season
November 12, 2021*; 6:30 p.m., ESPN+		at Appalachian State	L 67–69	0–1	Holmes Center (3,401); Boone, NC
November 14, 2021*; 12:00 p.m., SECN		at No. 18 Tennessee	L 62–94	0–2	Thompson-Boling Arena (16,564); Knoxville, TN
November 18, 2021*; 7:00 p.m., ESPN+		USC Upstate	W 56–43	1–2	Freedom Hall Civic Center (3,036); Johnson City, TN
November 22, 2021*; 5:30 p.m., FloSports		vs. Murray State; Naples Invitational first round	W 66–58	2–2	Community School of Naples (317); Naples, FL
November 23, 2021*; 8:00 p.m., FloSports		vs. Missouri State; Naples Invitational semifinals	W 77–76	3–2	Community School of Naples (317); Naples, FL
November 24, 2021*; 8:00 p.m., FloSports		vs. Kent State; Naples Invitational championship	W 57–51	4–2	Community School of Naples (237); Naples, FL
November 27, 2021*; 4:00 p.m., ESPN+		Lees-McRae	W 92–74	5–2	Freedom Hall Civic Center (2,818); Johnson City, TN
December 1, 2021*; 7:30 p.m., ESPN+		at UAB	L 56–70	5–3	Bartow Arena (2,695); Birmingham, AL
December 4, 2021*; 7:30 p.m., ESPN+		Lenoir-Rhyne	W 90–66	6–3	Freedom Hall Civic Center (2,524); Johnson City, TN
December 11, 2021*; 4:00 p.m., ESPN+		Morehead State	W 82–75	7–3	Freedom Hall Civic Center (2,100); Johnson City, TN
December 14, 2021*; 7:00 p.m.		North Carolina A&T	L 67–69	7–4	Freedom Hall Civic Center (2789); Johnson City, TN
December 18, 2021*; 2:00 p.m.		at UNC Asheville	L 64–79	7–5	Kimmel Arena (767); Asheville, NC
December 22, 2021*; 7:00 p.m.		at Georgia	W 86–84	8–5	Stegeman Coliseum (6,418); Athens, GA
SoCon regular season
December 30, 2021; 7:00 p.m., ESPNU		at Chattanooga	L 52–84	8–6 (0–1)	McKenzie Arena (3,025); Chattanooga, TN
January 5, 2022; 7:00 p.m., ESPN+		VMI	W 80–79	9–6 (1–1)	Freedom Hall Civic Center (2,922); Johnson City, TN
January 8, 2022; 4:00 p.m., ESPN+		Wofford	L 57–68	9–7 (1–2)	Freedom Hall Civic Center (3,708); Johnson City, TN
January 10, 2022; 7:00 p.m., ESPN+		Western Carolina; Rescheduled from Jan. 1	W 87–69	10–7 (2–2)	Freedom Hall Civic Center (2,522); Johnson City, TN
January 12, 2022; 7:00 p.m., ESPN+		at Furman	L 69–78	10–8 (2–3)	Timmons Arena (1,532); Greenville, SC
January 15, 2022; 3:00 p.m., ESPN+		at Samford	W 88–85	11–8 (3–3)	Pete Hanna Center (1,033); Homewood, AL
January 19, 2022; 7:00 p.m., ESPN+		Mercer	W 72–64	12–8 (4–3)	Freedom Hall Civic Center (3,270); Johnson City, TN
January 22, 2022; 4:00 p.m., ESPN+		The Citadel	L 73–75	12–9 (4–4)	Freedom Hall Civic Center (3,425); Johnson City, TN
January 26, 2022; 7:00 p.m., ESPN+		UNC Greensboro	L 76–80	12–10 (4–5)	Freedom Hall Civic Center (3,402); Johnson City, TN
January 29, 2022; 1:00 p.m., ESPN+		at VMI	L 79–83	12–11 (4–6)	Cameron Hall (2,245); Lexington, VA
February 2, 2022; 7:00 p.m., ESPN+		at Western Carolina	L 84–87	12–12 (4–7)	Ramsey Center (1,086); Cullowhee, NC
February 5, 2022; 7:00 p.m., CBSSN		at Wofford	L 60–62	12–13 (4–8)	Jerry Richardson Indoor Stadium (1,118); Spartanburg, SC
February 7, 2022; 7:00 p.m., ESPNU		Furman	W 75–71	13–13 (5–8)	Freedom Hall Civic Center (4,324); Johnson City, TN
February 12, 2022; 4:00 p.m., ESPN+		Samford	L 73–77	13–14 (5–9)	Freedom Hall Civic Center (4,502); Johnson City, TN
February 16, 2022; 7:00 p.m., ESPN+		at Mercer	L 56–65	13–15 (5–10)	Hawkins Arena (2,649); Macon, GA
February 19, 2022; 1:00 p.m., ESPN+		at The Citadel	W 77–67	14–15 (6–10)	McAlister Field House (929); Charleston, SC
February 23, 2022; 7:00 p.m., ESPN+		Chattanooga	L 77–83	14–16 (6–11)	Freedom Hall Civic Center (4,610); Johnson City, TN
February 27, 2022; 4:00 p.m., CBSSN		at UNC Greensboro	W 73–69	15–16 (7–11)	Greensboro Coliseum; Greensboro, NC
SoCon tournament
March 4, 2022; 5:00 p.m., ESPN+	(8)	vs. (9) The Citadel; First round	L 76–84 ^{OT}	15–17	Harrah's Cherokee Center; Asheville, NC
*Non-conference game. ^{#}Rankings from AP poll. (#) Tournament seedings in parentheses. All times are in Eastern.
