= 2021–22 Mercer Bears men's basketball team =

American college basketball season

2021–22 Mercer Bears men's basketball
- Conference: Southern Conference
- Record: 16–17 (8–10 SoCon)
- Head coach: Greg Gary (3rd season)
- Assistant coaches: Bobby Kummer; Kim Lewis; D.J. Byrd
- Home arena: Hawkins Arena

2021–22 Southern Conference men's basketball standings
	Conf.				Overall
Team	W		L	PCT	W		L	PCT
Chattanooga †	14	–	4	.778	27	–	8	.771
Furman	12	–	6	.667	22	–	12	.647
Samford	10	–	8	.556	21	–	11	.656
Wofford	10	–	8	.556	19	–	13	.594
VMI	9	–	9	.500	16	–	16	.500
UNC Greensboro	9	–	9	.500	17	–	15	.531
Mercer	8	–	10	.444	16	–	17	.485
East Tennessee State	7	–	11	.389	15	–	17	.469
The Citadel	6	–	12	.333	13	–	17	.433
Western Carolina	5	–	13	.278	11	–	21	.344
† 2022 SoCon Tournament winner

The 2021–22 Mercer Bears men's basketball team represented Mercer University in the 2021–22 NCAA Division I men's basketball season. The Bears, led by third-year head coach Greg Gary, played their home games at Hawkins Arena in Macon, Georgia as a member of the Southern Conference. They finished the season 16–17, 8–10 in SoCon play to finish in seventh place. They defeated Western Carolina in the first round of the SoCon tournament before losing to Furman in the quarterfinals.

== Previous season ==
In a season limited due to the ongoing COVID-19 pandemic, the Bears finished the 2020–21 season 18–11, 8–9 in SoCon play to finish in seventh place. In the SoCon tournament, they defeated Samford, Wofford, and VMI to advance to the championship game. There they lost to UNC Greensboro.

== Roster ==
2021–22 Mercer Bears men's basketball team
Players
Coaches

Pos.	#	Name	Height	Weight	Year	Hometown
G	1	Kamar Robertson	6 ft 2 in (1.88 m)	160 lb (73 kg)	Jr	Alpharetta, Georgia
G	2	Neftali Alvarez	6 ft 2 in (1.88 m)	165 lb (75 kg)	RS Jr	Cataño, Puerto Rico
C	3	Shannon Grant	6 ft 10 in (2.08 m)	280 lb (127 kg)	So	Sylacauga, Alabama
G	10	Jordan Jones	6 ft 0 in (1.83 m)	175 lb (79 kg)	Fr	Macon, Georgia
G	11	Jovan Tucker	6 ft 3 in (1.91 m)	175 lb (79 kg)	So	Atlanta, Georgia
C	14	Victor Bafutto	6 ft 10 in (2.08 m)	230 lb (104 kg)	RS Sr	Brasília, Brazil
F	15	John Treanor	6 ft 6 in (1.98 m)	210 lb (95 kg)	So	Roswell, Georgia
G	20	Jalen Johnson	6 ft 6 in (1.98 m)	195 lb (88 kg)	GS	Durham, North Carolina
F	22	Felipe Haase	6 ft 9 in (2.06 m)	253 lb (115 kg)	Sr	Osorno, Chile
F	23	James Glisson III	6 ft 6 in (1.98 m)	210 lb (95 kg)	Jr	Decatur, Georgia
G	25	Shawn Walker Jr.	6 ft 6 in (1.98 m)	202 lb (92 kg)	Jr	Elizabeth City, North Carolina
G	30	Diego Rivera	6 ft 2 in (1.88 m)	180 lb (82 kg)	Jr	Bayamón, Puerto Rico
G	31	Jacksen Greco	6 ft 3 in (1.91 m)	180 lb (82 kg)	So	Canton, Georgia
SG	32	Harrison Drake	6 ft 3 in (1.91 m)	180 lb (82 kg)	Jr	Newnan, Georgia

Head coach

- Greg Gary (Tulane)

Assistant coach(es)

- Bobby Kummer (Charlotte)
- Kim Lewis (Tulane)
- D.J. Byrd (Purdue)

Legend

- (C) Team captain
- (S) Suspended
- (I) Ineligible
- (W) Walk-on
- Injured
- Current redshirt

Roster
Last update: November 25, 2021

== Schedule and results ==
Date time, TV	Rank^{#}	Opponent^{#}	Result	Record	Site (attendance) city, state
Exhibition
November 3, 2021*; 7:00 pm		Fort Valley State	W 93–61	–	Hawkins Arena (1,027); Macon, GA
Non-conference regular season
November 9, 2021*; 8:00 pm, SECN+		at Arkansas	L 61–74	0–1	Bud Walton Arena (19,200); Fayetteville, AR
November 13, 2021*; 2:00 pm, ESPN+		at Winthrop	L 85–88 ^{OT}	0–2	Winthrop Coliseum (1,778); Rock Hill, SC
November 16, 2021*; 7:00 pm, ESPN+		Life	W 78–50	1–2	Hawkins Arena (1,332); Macon, GA
November 20, 2021*; 5:00 pm, ESPN+		at Saint Louis; Cancún Challenge campus game	L 58–75	1–3	Chaifetz Arena (4,725); St. Louis, MO
November 23, 2021*; 3:00 pm, FloHoops		vs. Bucknell; Cancún Challenge Mayan semifinal	W 78–68	2–3	Hard Rock Hotel Riviera (133); Cancún, Mexico
November 24, 2021*; 3:00 pm, FloHoops		vs. Middle Tennessee; Cancún Challenge Mayan championship	L 58–82	2–4	Hard Rock Hotel Riviera (103); Cancún, Mexico
November 27, 2021*; 2:00 pm, ESPN+		Milligan	W 88–49	3–4	Hawkins Arena (427); Macon, GA
December 1, 2021*; 7:00 pm, ESPN+		at Kennesaw State	W 73–71	4–4	KSU Convocation Center (1,518); Kennesaw, GA
December 4, 2021*; 2:00 pm, ESPN+		Georgia State	W 83–77	5–4	Hawkins Arena (901); Macon, GA
December 6, 2021*; 7:00 pm, ESPN+		at Coastal Carolina	W 74–69	6–4	HTC Center (953); Conway, SC
December 11, 2021*; 2:00 pm, ESPN+		Georgia Southern	W 77–68	7–4	Hawkins Arena (2,322); Macon, GA
December 19, 2021*; 2:00 pm, ESPN+		at Florida Gulf Coast	L 55–67	7–5	Alico Arena (1,711); Fort Myers, FL
December 22, 2021*; 6:00 pm, ESPN+		Troy	L 65–69	7–6	Hawkins Arena (1,256); Macon, GA
SoCon regular season
January 5, 2022; 7:00 pm, ESPN+		Samford	W 83–80	8–6 (1–0)	Hawkins Arena (1,082); Macon, GA
January 8, 2022; 4:00 pm, ESPN+		at Furman	L 66–81	8–7 (1–1)	Bon Secours Wellness Arena (3,217); Greenville, SC
January 13, 2022; 7:00 pm, ESPN+		VMI	W 97-91	9–7 (2–1)	Hawkins Arena (1,341); Macon, GA
January 15, 2022; 2:00 pm, ESPN+		UNC Greensboro	W 58–49	10–7 (3–1)	Hawkins Arena (1,981); Macon, GA
January 17, 2022; 7:00 pm, ESPN+		at The Citadel; Rescheduled from Dec. 29	W 71–64	11–7 (4–1)	McAlister Field House (731); Charleston, SC
January 19, 2022; 7:00 pm, ESPN+		at East Tennessee State	L 64–72	11–8 (4–2)	Freedom Hall Civic Center (3,270); Johnson City, TN
January 22, 2022; 5:00 pm, ESPN+		Western Carolina	W 72–64	12–8 (5–2)	Hawkins Arena (2,271); Macon, GA
January 26, 2022; 7:00 pm, ESPN+		at Samford	L 61–75	12–9 (5–3)	Pete Hanna Center (891); Homewood, AL
January 29, 2022; 6:00 pm, ESPN+		Furman	L 50–80	12–10 (5–4)	Hawkins Arena (3,572); Macon, GA
January 31, 2022; 7:00 pm, ESPNU		Wofford	W 67–62	13–10 (6–4)	Hawkins Arena (1,792); Macon, GA
February 5, 2022; 12:00 pm, ESPNU		at Chattanooga	L 68–77	13–11 (6–5)	McKenzie Arena (3,192); Chattanooga, TN
February 7, 2022; 7:00 pm, ESPN+		Chattanooga; Rescheduled from Jan. 1	L 72–74 ^{OT}	13–12 (6–6)	Hawkins Arena (1,826); Macon, GA
February 10, 2022; 7:00 pm, ESPN+		at VMI	L 79–85	13–13 (6–7)	Cameron Hall (1,214); Lexington, VA
February 13, 2022; 3:00 pm, ESPN+		at UNC Greensboro	W 73–64	14–13 (7–7)	Greensboro Coliseum (1,509); Greensboro, NC
February 16, 2022; 7:00 pm, ESPN+		East Tennessee State	W 65–56	15–13 (8–7)	Hawkins Arena (2,649); Macon, GA
February 19, 2022; 2:00 pm, ESPN+		at Western Carolina	L 65–69	15–14 (8–8)	Ramsey Center (1,721); Cullowhee, NC
February 23, 2022; 2:00 pm, ESPN+		The Citadel	L 67–71	15–15 (8–9)	Hawkins Arena (2,221); Macon, GA
February 26, 2022; 7:00 pm, ESPN+		at Wofford	L 67–74	15–16 (8–10)	Jerry Richardson Indoor Stadium (1,551); Spartanburg, SC
SoCon tournament
March 4, 2022; 7:30 pm, ESPN+	(7)	vs. (10) Western Carolina; First Round	W 81–53	16–16	Harrah's Cherokee Center (3,113); Asheville, NC
March 5, 2022; 6:00 pm, ESPN+/Nexstar	(7)	vs. (2) Furman; Quarterfinals	L 66–80	16–17	Harrah's Cherokee Center (3,032); Asheville, NC
*Non-conference game. ^{#}Rankings from AP Poll. (#) Tournament seedings in parentheses. All times are in Eastern.
