= 2021–22 UNC Greensboro Spartans men's basketball team =

American college basketball season

2021–22 UNC Greensboro Spartans men's basketball
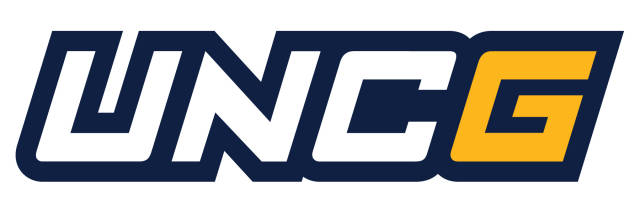

CBI, First Round
- Conference: Southern Conference
- Record: 17–15 (9–9 SoCon)
- Head coach: Mike Jones (1st season)
- Assistant coaches: David Boyden; Donny Lind; Ron Jirsa
- Home arena: Greensboro Coliseum Complex; Fleming Gymnasium

2021–22 Southern Conference men's basketball standings
	Conf.				Overall
Team	W		L	PCT	W		L	PCT
Chattanooga †	14	–	4	.778	27	–	8	.771
Furman	12	–	6	.667	22	–	12	.647
Samford	10	–	8	.556	21	–	11	.656
Wofford	10	–	8	.556	19	–	13	.594
VMI	9	–	9	.500	16	–	16	.500
UNC Greensboro	9	–	9	.500	17	–	15	.531
Mercer	8	–	10	.444	16	–	17	.485
East Tennessee State	7	–	11	.389	15	–	17	.469
The Citadel	6	–	12	.333	13	–	17	.433
Western Carolina	5	–	13	.278	11	–	21	.344
† 2022 SoCon Tournament winner

The 2021–22 UNC Greensboro Spartans men's basketball team represented the University of North Carolina at Greensboro during the 2021–22 NCAA Division I men's basketball season. The Spartans, led by first-year head coach Mike Jones, played their home games at the Greensboro Coliseum and Fleming Gymnasium in Greensboro, North Carolina as members of the Southern Conference (SoCon). They finished the season 17–14, 9–9 in SoCon play to finish in a tie for fifth place. As the No. 6 seed in the SoCon tournament, they lost to Samford in the quarterfinals. Guard De'Monte Buckingham was named to the Southern Conference Sports Media Association third team. They accepted an invitation to play in the 2022 College Basketball Invitational tournament where, as a No. 7 seed, they lost to No. 10-seeded Boston University in the first round.

== Previous season ==
In a season limited due to the ongoing COVID-19 pandemic, the Spartans finished the 2020–21 season 21–9, 13–5 in SoCon play to win the regular season championship. They went on to win the SoCon tournament, defeating Mercer in the final, and receiving the automatic berth to the 2021 NCAA Division I men's basketball tournament, where they lost in the Round of 64 to Florida State.

Guard Isaiah Miller was named Southern Conference Men's Basketball Player of the Year for the second consecutive year, the first men's player to do so since Stephen Curry. He was also named conference Defensive Player of the Year and named to the All-Southern Conference first-team for a third consecutive season.

== Offseason ==
Following the 2020-21 season, head coach Wes Miller left UNCG to take the position of head men's basketball coach at Cincinnati.

On April 19, 2021, Mike Jones, previously of Radford, was hired to be the new head men's basketball coach.

Nine players entered the transfer portal with graduate student Hayden Koval and sophomores Jarrett Hensley and A.J. McGinnis, along with assistant coach Chris LePore, electing to join Miller at Cincinnati. Senior Kaleb Hunter and junior Bas Leyte withdrew from the transfer portal and chose to stay at UNCG.

The Spartans mitigated those transfer losses with transfers of their own, bringing in Graduate Student De'Monte Buckingham from Cal State-Bakersfield, Senior Dante Treacy from Robert Morris, and Junior Jalen White from Texas A&M-Corpus Christi, all of whom were expected to make an impact on Mike Jones's team.

=== Departing players ===
Departing Players
Name	Number	Position	Height	Weight	Year	Hometown	Notes
Isaiah Miller	1	G	6'0"	190	Senior	Covington, Georgia	Graduated
A.J. McGinnis	2	G	6'3"	180	Freshman	Huntsville, Alabama	Transferred to Cincinnati
Michael Hueitt, Jr.	11	G	6'3"	185	(redshirt) Senior	Fayetteville, North Carolina	Graduated, Transferred to McNeese State
Angelo Allegri	13	F	6'7"	205	Junior	Kansas City, Missouri	Transferred to Eastern Washington
Dericko Williams	15	F	6'8"	220	(redshirt) Sophomore	Kinston, North Carolina	Transferred to Tallahassee Community College
Hayden Koval	25	C	7'1"	220	Senior	Prosper, Texas	Graduated, Transferred to Cincinnati
Ryan Tankelewicz	30	G	5'11"	170	Junior	Raleigh, North Carolina	Walk–on; Entered Transfer Portal
Jarrett Hensley	32	F	6'8"	205	Freshman	Merriam, Kansas	Transferred to Cincinnati

=== Incoming transfers ===
incoming transfers
Name	Position	Height	Weight	Year	Hometown	Previous School
De'Monte Buckingham	G	6'4"	220	Graduate Student	Richmond, Virginia	Cal State-Bakersfield
Miles Jones	G/F	6'6"	215	Junior	Radford, Virginia	Radford
Jalen White	F	6'5"	240	Junior	St. Petersburg, Florida	Texas A&M-Corpus Christi
Dante Treacy	G	6'0"	170	Senior	Orlando, Florida	Robert Morris

== Roster ==
2020–21 UNC Greensboro Spartans men's basketball team
Players
Coaches

Pos.	#	Name	Height	Weight	Year	Hometown
G	0	Keyshaun Langley	6 ft 1 in (1.85 m)	175 lb (79 kg)	Jr	High Point, North Carolina
G	2	A.J. Williams (redshirt)	6 ft 0 in (1.83 m)	155 lb (70 kg)	Fr	Richmond, Virginia
G	3	Kobe Langley	6 ft 1 in (1.85 m)	180 lb (82 kg)	Jr	High Point, North Carolina
F	4	Mohammed Abdulsalam	6 ft 9 in (2.06 m)	255 lb (116 kg)	Sr	Ibadan, Nigeria
G	10	De'Monte Buckingham	6 ft 4 in (1.93 m)	220 lb (100 kg)	GS	Richmond, Virginia
G	11	J.C Tharrington (W)	6 ft 1 in (1.85 m)	180 lb (82 kg)	Jr	Charlotte, North Carolina
F	12	Khyre Thompson	6 ft 6 in (1.98 m)	190 lb (86 kg)	RS Jr	Kernersville, North Carolina
F	13	Miles Jones (W)	6 ft 6 in (1.98 m)	210 lb (95 kg)	Jr	Radford, Virginia
F	14	Jalen White	6 ft 5 in (1.96 m)	245 lb (111 kg)	Jr	St. Petersburg, Florida
G	15	Jevon Johnson	6 ft 3 in (1.91 m)	170 lb (77 kg)	Fr	Durham, North Carolina
F	22	Jalen Breath (redshirt)	6 ft 9 in (2.06 m)	235 lb (107 kg)	Fr	Moore, Oklahoma
G	24	Dante Treacy	6 ft 0 in (1.83 m)	175 lb (79 kg)	Sr	Orlando, Florida
F	33	Bas Leyte	6 ft 10 in (2.08 m)	220 lb (100 kg)	Jr	Bergen op Zoom, Netherlands
G	44	Kaleb Hunter	6 ft 4 in (1.93 m)	190 lb (86 kg)	RS Sr	Raleigh, North Carolina

Head coach

- Mike Jones (Howard)

Assistant coach(es)

- David Boyden (Western Kentucky)
- Donny Lind (Loyola (MD))
- Ron Jirsa (Gettysburg)

Legend

- (C) Team captain
- (S) Suspended
- (I) Ineligible
- (W) Walk-on
- Injured
- Current redshirt

Roster
Last update: April 27, 2021

== Schedule and results ==
Date time, TV	Rank^{#}	Opponent^{#}	Result	Record	High points	High rebounds	High assists	Site (attendance) city, state
Non-conference regular season
November 9, 2021*; 7:00 pm, ESPN+		North Carolina A&T; Battle of Market Street	W 57–53	1–0	28 – Buckingham	11 – Abdulsalam	3 – Treacy	Greensboro Coliseum (6,288); Greensboro, NC
November 12, 2021*; 7:00 pm, ESPN+		at Northern Kentucky	W 70–69 ^{OT}	2–0	13 – Abdulsalam	10 – Abdulsalam	4 – Ko. Langley	BB&T Arena (2,489); Highland Heights, KY
November 15, 2021*; 7:00 pm, ESPN+		Coppin State	W 55–48	3–0	13 – Thompson	12 – Buckingham	4 – Buckingham	Greensboro Coliseum (2,572); Greensboro, NC
November 18, 2021*; 3:00 pm, CBSSN		vs. Green Bay; Jersey Mike’s Classic	W 60–58	4–0	16 – Ko. Langley	10 – Buckingham	3 – Treacy	McArthur Center (143); St. Petersburg, FL
November 19, 2021*; 3:00 pm, CBSSN		vs. Massachusetts; Jersey Mike's Classic	L 90–93 ^{OT}	4–1	18 – Hunter	12 – Buckingham	5 – Treacy	McArthur Center (341); St. Petersburg, FL
November 21, 2021*; 5:00 pm, CBSSN		vs. FIU; Jersey Mike's Classic	L 71–74 ^{OT}	4–2	21 – Buckingham	10 – Buckingham	4 – Ko. Langley	McArthur Center (175); St. Petersburg, FL
November 24, 2021*; 7:00 pm, ESPN+		NC Wesleyan	W 80–61	5–2	18 – Leyte	9 – White	4 – Hunter	Greensboro Coliseum (1,632); Greensboro, NC
November 27, 2021*; 5:00 pm, ESPN+		Vermont	W 54–51	6–2	19 – Ko. Langley	8 – Buckingham	3 – Treacy	Greensboro Coliseum (1,739); Greensboro, NC
November 30, 2021*; 7:00 pm, ESPN+		Elon	W 74–61	7–2	21 – Buckingham	8 – Leyte	6 – Treacy	Greensboro Coliseum (1,847); Greensboro, NC
December 11, 2021*; 4:30 pm, SECN		at No. 13 Tennessee	L 36–76	7–3	10 – Buckingham	5 – Tied	2 – Ko. Langley	Thompson-Boling Arena (16,074); Knoxville, TN
December 14, 2021*; 7:00 pm, FloSports		at Towson	L 64–74	7–4	20 – Buckingham	8 – Buckingham	4 – Ko. Langley	SECU Arena (1,565); Towson, MD
December 16, 2021*; 7:00 pm, ESPN3		at UMBC	W 62–51	8–4	11 – Buckingham	6 – Tied	3 – Ko. Langley	UMBC Event Center (1,162); Catonsville, MD
December 21, 2021*; 7:00 pm		Johnson & Wales	Cancelled due to COVID-19 Issues					Fleming Gymnasium; Greensboro, NC
SoCon Regular Season
January 5, 2022; 7:00 pm, ESPNews		Furman	L 54–58	8–5 (0–1)	14 – Buckingham	9 – Abdulsalam	4 – Ko. Langley	Greensboro Coliseum (1,537); Greensboro, NC
January 8, 2022; 1:00 pm, ESPN+		at VMI	W 72–56	9–5 (1–1)	18 – Ko. Langley	9 – Buckingham	3 – Tied	Cameron Hall (747); Lexington, VA
January 10, 2022; 6:00 pm, ESPN+		Wofford; Rescheduled from Jan. 1	W 58–54	10–5 (2–1)	19 – Ko. Langley	6 – Buckingham	3 – Tied (3)	Greensboro Coliseum (1,320); Greensboro, NC
January 13, 2022; 7:00 pm, ESPN+		at The Citadel	L 69–74	10–6 (2–2)	14 – Buckingham	8 – Leyte	7 – Ko. Langley	McAlister Field House (1,298); Charleston, SC
January 15, 2022; 2:00 pm, ESPN+		at Mercer	L 49–59	10–7 (2–3)	18 – Buckingham	8 – Leyte	6 – Ko. Langley	Hawkins Arena (1,981); Macon, GA
January 20, 2022; 7:00 pm, ESPN+		Chattanooga	L 64–72	10–8 (2–4)	21 – Ke. Langley	7 – Buckingham	4 – Treacy	Greensboro Coliseum (1,749); Greensboro, NC
January 22, 2022; 5:00 pm, ESPN+		Samford	W 61–58	11–8 (3–4)	15 – Ke. Langley	5 – Tied	4 – Tied	Greensboro Coliseum (1,462); Greensboro, NC
January 26, 2022; 7:00 pm, ESPN+		at East Tennessee State	W 80–76	12–8 (4–4)	25 – Buckingham	8 – Buckingham	6 – Treacy	Freedom Hall Civic Center (3,402); Johnson City, TN
January 29, 2022; 7:00 pm, ESPN+		at Wofford	L 66–85	12–9 (4–5)	15 – Buckingham	6 – Leyte	4 – Ke. Langley	Jerry Richardson Indoor Stadium (1,597); Spartanburg, SC
February 2, 2022; 7:00 pm, ESPN+		VMI	L 65–76	12–10 (4–6)	19 – Ke. Langley	5 – Tied	4 – Ko. Langley	Greensboro Coliseum (1,559); Greensboro, NC
February 5, 2022; 12:00 pm, ESPN+		at Furman	W 58–56	13–10 (5–6)	12 – Buckingham	10 – Leyte	4 – Ke. Langley	Bon Secours Wellness Arena (3,616); Greenville, SC
February 7, 2022; 7:00 pm, ESPN+		at Western Carolina; Rescheduled from Dec. 29	W 68–49	14–10 (6–6)	15 – Hunter	10 – Leyte	5 – Ke. Langley	Ramsey Center (1,007); Cullowhee, NC
February 10, 2022; 7:00 pm, ESPN+		The Citadel	W 86–66	15–10 (7–6)	20 – Leyte	10 – Abdulsalam	4 – Tied	Greensboro Coliseum (1,536); Greensboro, NC
February 13, 2022; 3:00 pm, ESPN+		Mercer	L 64–73	15–11 (7–7)	19 – Ke. Langley	7 – Leyte	3 – Tied	Greensboro Coliseum (1,509); Greensboro, NC
February 17, 2022; 7:00 pm, ESPN+		at Chattanooga	W 73–70	16–11 (8–7)	23 – Leyte	10 – Buckingham	4 – Buckingham	McKenzie Arena (3,101); Chattanooga, TN
February 19, 2022; 3:00 pm, ESPN+		at Samford	L 49–55	16–12 (8–8)	13 – Tied	8 – Ko. Langley	2 – Tied (3)	Pete Hanna Center (1,310); Homewood, AL
February 23, 2022; 7:00 pm, ESPN+		Western Carolina	W 73–64	17–12 (9–8)	24 – Treacy	8 – Abdulsalam	3 – Ko. Langley	Greensboro Coliseum (1,978); Greensboro, NC
February 27, 2022; 4:00 pm, CBSSN		East Tennessee State	L 69–73	17–13 (9–9)	21 – Ko. Langley	8 – Abdulsalam	3 – Tied	Greensboro Coliseum (2,325); Greensboro, NC
SoCon tournament
March 5, 2022; 8:00 pm, ESPN+	(6)	vs. (3) Samford; Quarterfinals	L 64–66	17–14	16 – Treacy	8 – Buckingham	5 – Treacy	Harrah's Cherokee Center (3,032); Asheville, NC
CBI tournament
March 20, 2022; 5:00 pm, FloSports	(7)	vs. (10) Boston University; First Round	L 68–71	17–15	21 – Buckingham	6 – Leyte	6 – Treacy	Ocean Center (762); Daytona Beach, FL
*Non-conference game. ^{#}Rankings from AP Poll. (#) Tournament seedings in parentheses. All times are in Eastern Time.

== Awards and honors ==
=== Southern Conference honors ===
==== SoCon Sports Media Association Third Team ====
- De'Monte Buckingham
