= Lamont Paris =

American basketball player and coach

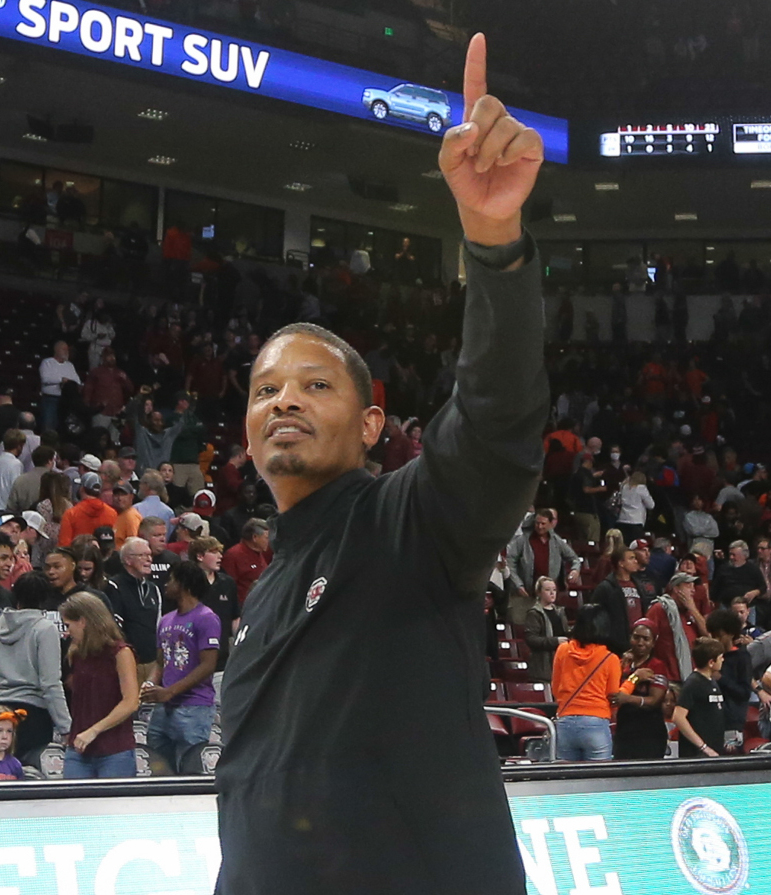
- Paris in 2022

Current position
- Title: Head coach
- Team: South Carolina
- Conference: SEC
- Record: 67–68 (.496)

Biographical details
- Born: November 11, 1974 (age 52); Findlay, Ohio, U.S.

Playing career
- 1992–1996: Wooster

Coaching career (HC unless noted)
- 1997–1998: Wooster (assistant)
- 1999–2000: DePauw (assistant)
- 2001–2004: IUP (assistant)
- 2005–2010: Akron (assistant)
- 2010–2017: Wisconsin (assistant)
- 2017–2022: Chattanooga
- 2022–present: South Carolina

Head coaching record
- Overall: 154–140 (.524)
- Tournaments: 0–2 (NCAA Division I)

Accomplishments and honors

Championships
- SoCon tournament (2022); SoCon regular season (2022)

Awards
- SoCon Coach of the Year (2022); SEC Coach of the Year (2024)

Lamont Paris (born November 11, 1974) is an American college basketball coach who is currently the head men's basketball coach at South Carolina.

== Playing career ==
Paris played high school basketball at Findlay High School in Findlay, Ohio. He then played college basketball at the College of Wooster, Ohio, where he was captain for his junior and senior seasons while also being a two-time All-North Coast Athletic Conference selection.

== Coaching career ==
After beginning his coaching career as an assistant at his alma mater during the 1997-98 season, Paris moved on to assistant coaching stints at DePauw and IUP before landing on Keith Dambrot's staff at Akron where he stayed for five seasons. Paris then joined Bo Ryan's staff at Wisconsin in 2010, and was a part of two Sweet 16 squads and the Badgers' Final Four and national championship game appearances during the 2013–14 and 2014-15 seasons. When Ryan stepped down, Paris was elevated to associate head coach under Greg Gard when Gard was given the job on a permanent basis.

=== Chattanooga ===
On April 4, 2017, Paris was introduced as the 20th head coach in Chattanooga history, replacing Matt McCall who left to become the head coach at Massachusetts. During the 2021–22 season, Paris led the Mocs to a 27–8 record and the Southern Conference regular season and tournament championships. In the NCAA Tournament, 13th seeded Chattanooga narrowly lost to Illinois 54–53.

=== South Carolina ===
On March 22, 2022, Paris was officially announced as head basketball coach at South Carolina, replacing Frank Martin. Paris, who signed a five-year deal, became the first African-American to lead the Gamecocks' men's basketball program. The 2023-2024 season saw Paris named SEC Coach of the Year after leading the Gamecocks to a 13-5 conference record and 26-8 overall record. He was also named a finalist for the 2023-24 Werner Ladder Naismith Men's College Coach of the Year Award.

== Head coaching record ==
Record table
Season	Team	Overall	Conference	Standing	Postseason
Chattanooga Mocs (Southern Conference) (2017–2022)
2017–18	Chattanooga	10–23	3–15	10th	
2018–19	Chattanooga	12–20	7–11	5th	
2019–20	Chattanooga	20–13	10–8	T–5th	
2020–21	Chattanooga	18–8	9–7	4th	
2021–22	Chattanooga	27–8	14–4	1st	NCAA Division I Round of 64
Chattanooga:		87–72 (.547)	43–45 (.489)		
South Carolina Gamecocks (Southeastern Conference) (2022–present)
2022–23	South Carolina	11–21	4–14	12th	
2023–24	South Carolina	26–8	13–5	T–2nd	NCAA Division I Round of 64
2024–25	South Carolina	12–20	2–16	16th	
2025–26	South Carolina	13–19	4–14	T–14th	
2026–27	South Carolina	5–0	0–0		
South Carolina:		67–68 (.496)	23–49 (.319)		
Total:		154–140 (.524)			
National champion Postseason invitational champion Conference regular season champion Conference regular season and conference tournament champion Division regular season champion Division regular season and conference tournament champion Conference tournament champion
