= Jay McAuley =

American basketball player and coach (born 1983)

Current position
- Title: Head coach
- Team: Lassiter Trojans

Biographical details
- Born: August 7, 1983 (age 43); Marietta, Georgia, U.S.

Playing career
- 2003–2006: Georgia

Coaching career (HC unless noted)
- 2008–2010: Wofford (assistant)
- 2010–2013: Gardner-Webb (assistant)
- 2013–2017: Furman (assistant)
- 2017–2019: Wofford (assistant)
- 2019–2022: Wofford
- 2023–present: Lassiter HS (GA)

Head coaching record
- Overall: 58–41 (.586)

Accomplishments and honors

Awards
- Skip Prosser Man of the Year Award (2022)

Jay McAuley (born August 7, 1983) is an American former basketball player and coach. He was the head coach of the Wofford Terriers men's basketball team. Presently, McAuley is the head coach of the Lassiter High School basketball team.

== Playing career ==
McAuley played basketball at Georgia where he appeared in 46 games. He was part of the Bulldogs 2008 SEC men's basketball tournament championship squad and its 2008 NCAA tournament team.

== Coaching career ==
After working as a student manager at his alma mater once his playing career wrapped up, McAuley joined Mike Young's staff at Wofford for his first assistant coaching position. From there, he'd move on to an assistant coaching spot at Gardner-Webb for a three-year stretch before landing at Furman as assistant coach from 2013 to 2017. McAuley would rejoin Wofford's staff in 2017, and was part of the staff that won both the Southern Conference regular season and tournament championship earning a seven-seed in the 2019 NCAA tournament where the Terriers advanced to the round of 32.

On April 14, 2019, McAuley was promoted to head coach of the Terriers following the departure of Young who accepted the head coaching position at Virginia Tech. On December 30, 2022, McAuley resigned his coaching position following a month-long leave of absence.

On May 24, 2023, Lassiter High School named McAuley their head basketball coach. Lassiter High School is located in Marietta, Georgia, McAuley's hometown (McAuley graduated from Pope High School).

== Head coaching record ==
Record table
Season	Team	Overall	Conference	Standing	Postseason
Wofford Terriers (Southern Conference) (2019–2022)
2019–20	Wofford	19–16	8–10	7th	
2020–21	Wofford	15–8	12–5	2nd	
2021–22	Wofford	19–13	10–8	T–3rd	TBC
2022–23*	Wofford	17–16	8–10	6th	TBC (Withdrew)
Wofford:		58–41** (.586)	30–23 (.566)		
Lassiter High School (GHSA 5A Region 6) (2023–Present)
2023–24	Lassiter High School	18–8	8–4	2nd	
2024-25	Lassiter High School	12-14	4-10	7th	
Lassiter:		30–22 (.577)	12-14 (.462)		
Total:		88-63 (.583)			

    - McAuley only coached 9 games of the 2022-23 season (5-4)
