= 2022–23 Chattanooga Mocs men's basketball team =

American college basketball season

2022–23 Chattanooga Mocs men's basketball
- Conference: Southern Conference
- Record: 18–17 (7–11 SoCon)
- Head coach: Dan Earl (1st season)
- Assistant coaches: Ander Galfsky; Scott Greenman; Kenneth White
- Home arena: McKenzie Arena

2022–23 Southern Conference men's basketball standings
	Conf.				Overall
Team	W		L	PCT	W		L	PCT
Furman †	15	–	3	.833	28	–	8	.778
Samford	15	–	3	.833	21	–	11	.656
UNC Greensboro	14	–	4	.778	20	–	12	.625
Western Carolina	10	–	8	.556	18	–	16	.529
East Tennessee State	8	–	10	.444	12	–	20	.375
Wofford	8	–	10	.444	17	–	16	.515
Chattanooga	7	–	11	.389	18	–	17	.514
Mercer	6	–	12	.333	14	–	19	.424
The Citadel	5	–	13	.278	10	–	22	.313
VMI	2	–	16	.111	7	–	25	.219
† 2023 SoCon tournament winner

The 2022–23 Chattanooga Mocs men's basketball team represented the University of Tennessee at Chattanooga in the 2022–23 NCAA Division I men's basketball season. The Mocs, led by first-year head coach Dan Earl, played their home games at McKenzie Arena in Chattanooga, Tennessee, as members of the Southern Conference.

== Previous season ==
They finished the season 27–8, 14–4 in SoCon play to win the regular season SoCon championship. As the No. 1 seed in the SoCon tournament, they defeated The Citadel, Wofford, and Furman to win the tournament championship. As a result, they received the conference's automatic bid to the NCAA tournament as the No. 13 seed in the South Region, where they lost in the first round to Illinois.

== Roster ==
2022–23 Chattanooga Mocs men's basketball team
Players
Coaches

Pos.	#	Name	Height	Weight	Year	Hometown
G	0	A. J. Caldwell	6 ft 5 in (1.96 m)	200 lb (91 kg)	RS Sr	Sarasota, Florida
F	1	KC Hankton	6 ft 7 in (2.01 m)	215 lb (98 kg)	Sr	Charlotte, North Carolina
G	2	Jamaal Walker	6 ft 5 in (1.96 m)	194 lb (88 kg)	RS So	Chattanooga, Tennessee
G	3	Honor Huff	5 ft 10 in (1.78 m)	155 lb (70 kg)	So	Brooklyn, New York
F	4	Sam Alexis	6 ft 9 in (2.06 m)	190 lb (86 kg)	Fr	Apopka, Florida
G	5	Jamal Johnson	6 ft 4 in (1.93 m)	195 lb (88 kg)	Sr	Birmingham, Alabama
G	10	Dalvin White	5 ft 10 in (1.78 m)	162 lb (73 kg)	GS	Norcross, Georgia
G	11	Ashton Smith	5 ft 8 in (1.73 m)	163 lb (74 kg)	RS Jr	Memphis, Tennessee
G	12	Johnny Taylor Jr.	6 ft 3 in (1.91 m)	184 lb (83 kg)	RS Fr	Ocoee, Florida
G	13	Kristion Courseault	6 ft 2 in (1.88 m)	180 lb (82 kg)	Jr	Los Angeles, California
F	22	Demetrius Davis	6 ft 9 in (2.06 m)	185 lb (84 kg)	Jr	Atlanta, Georgia
C	33	Jake Stephens	7 ft 0 in (2.13 m)	275 lb (125 kg)	GS	Bunker Hill, West Virginia
G/F	34	Randy Brady	6 ft 5 in (1.96 m)	215 lb (98 kg)	RS Fr	Chattanooga, Tennessee
G/F	35	Grant Ledford	6 ft 5 in (1.96 m)	215 lb (98 kg)	RS Jr	Knoxville, Tennessee
G	55	Brody Robinson	5 ft 10 in (1.78 m)	150 lb (68 kg)	Fr	Houston, Texas

Head coach

- Dan Earl (Penn State)

Assistant coach(es)

- Ander Galfsky (Birmingham–Southern)
- Scott Greenman (Princeton)
- Kenneth White (North Carolina)

Legend

- (C) Team captain
- (S) Suspended
- (I) Ineligible
- (W) Walk-on
- Injured
- Current redshirt

Roster
Last update: November 5, 2022

== Schedule and results ==
Date time, TV	Rank^{#}	Opponent^{#}	Result	Record	Site (attendance) city, state
Non-conference regular season
November 7, 2022*; 7:30 pm, FloHoops		at College of Charleston	L 78–85	0–1	TD Arena (4,006); Charleston, SC
November 10, 2022*; 7:00 pm, ESPN+		Oakland City	W 93–49	1–1	McKenzie Arena (2,755); Chattanooga, TN
November 15, 2022*; 7:30 pm, SECN+		at Ole Miss	L 58–70	1–2	SJB Pavilion (5,479); Oxford, MS
November 19, 2022*; 2:00 pm, ESPN+		Covenant	W 108–55	2–2	McKenzie Arena (2,510); Chattanooga, TN
November 23, 2022*; 4:00 pm, ESPN+		Lipscomb	L 66–72	2–3	McKenzie Arena (2,717); Chattanooga, TN
November 26, 2022*; 7:00 pm, ESPN+		Murray State	W 69–66	3–3	McKenzie Arena (2,934); Chattanooga, TN
November 30, 2022*; 7:00 pm, ESPN+		at Tennessee Tech	W 81–74	4–3	Eblen Center (831); Cookeville, TN
December 3, 2022*; 2:00 pm, ESPN+		at Gardner–Webb	W 82–71	5–3	Paul Porter Arena (334); Boiling Springs, NC
December 6, 2022*; 7:00 pm, ESPN+		Milwaukee	W 88–76	6–3	McKenzie Arena (2,658); Chattanooga, TN
December 10, 2022*; 7:00 pm, ESPN+		Johnson (TN)	W 97–47	7–3	McKenzie Arena (2,452); Chattanooga, TN
December 15, 2022*; 7:00 pm, ESPN+		at Middle Tennessee	W 82–73	8–3	Murphy Center (5,832); Murfreesboro, TN
December 18, 2022*; 2:00 pm, ESPN+		Belmont	L 79–83 ^{OT}	8–4	McKenzie Arena (3,466); Chattanooga, TN
December 21, 2022*; 3:00 pm, SECN+		at Georgia	L 65–72	8–5	Stegeman Coliseum (7,918); Athens, GA
SoCon Regular season
December 29, 2022; 7:00 pm, ESPN+		at The Citadel	L 68–76	8–6 (0–1)	McAlister Field House (1,237); Charleston, SC
December 31, 2022; 2:00 pm, ESPN+		at Mercer	W 80–51	9–6 (1–1)	Hawkins Arena; Macon, GA
January 4, 2023; 7:00 pm, ESPN+		at UNC Greensboro	L 61–73	9–7 (1–2)	Greensboro Coliseum (1,082); Greensboro, NC
January 7, 2023; 2:00 pm, ESPN+		VMI	W 85–78	10–7 (2–2)	McKenzie Arena (3,556); Chattanooga, TN
January 11, 2023; 7:00 pm, ESPN+		Western Carolina	W 95–76	11–7 (3–2)	McKenzie Arena (3,009); Chattanooga, TN
January 14, 2023; 6:00 pm, ESPNU		at Samford	L 74–75	11–8 (3–3)	Pete Hanna Center (3,027); Homewood, AL
January 18, 2023; 7:00 pm, ESPN+		Furman	L 69–77	11–9 (3–4)	McKenzie Arena (3,402); Chattanooga, TN
January 21, 2023; 3:00 pm, ESPN+		East Tennessee State	L 62–78	11–10 (3–5)	McKenzie Arena (3,751); Chattanooga, TN
January 25, 2023; 7:00 pm, ESPN+		Wofford	L 80–85	11–11 (3–6)	McKenzie Arena (2,908); Chattanooga, TN
January 28, 2023; 4:00 pm, ESPN+		at East Tennessee State	W 73–64	12–11 (4–6)	Freedom Hall Civic Center (3,914); Johnson City, TN
February 1, 2023; 2:00 pm, ESPN+		at Furman	L 58–79	12–12 (4–7)	Timmons Arena (1,627); Greenville, SC
February 4, 2023; 2:00 pm, ESPN+		at Western Carolina	L 68–83	12–13 (4–8)	Ramsey Center (3,157); Cullowhee, NC
February 8, 2023; 7:00 pm, ESPN+		The Citadel	W 82–63	13–13 (5–8)	McKenzie Arena (3,061); Chattanooga, TN
February 11, 2023; 3:30 pm, CBSSN		Mercer	W 73–56	14–13 (6–8)	McKenzie Arena (3,680); Chattanooga, TN
February 15, 2023; 7:00 pm, ESPN+		at VMI	W 78–58	15–13 (7–8)	Cameron Hall (790); Lexington, VA
February 18, 2023; 12:00 pm, CBSSN		UNC Greensboro	L 76–93	15–14 (7–9)	McKenzie Arena (3,560); Chattanooga, TN
February 22, 2023; 7:00 pm, ESPN+		Samford	L 70–75	15–15 (7–10)	McKenzie Arena (3,189); Chattanooga, TN
February 25, 2023; 7:00 pm, ESPN+		at Wofford	L 74–86	15–16 (7–11)	Jerry Richardson Indoor Stadium (1,941); Spartanburg, SC
SoCon tournament
March 3, 2022; 7:30 pm, ESPN+	(7)	vs. (10) VMI; First round	W 92–72	16–16	Harrah's Cherokee Center (2,765); Asheville, NC
March 4, 2022; 6:00 pm, ESPN+/Nexstar	(7)	vs. (2) Samford; Quarterfinals	W 85–82	17–16	Harrah's Cherokee Center; Asheville, NC
March 5, 2022; 6:30 pm, ESPNU	(7)	vs. (6) Wofford; Semifinals	W 74–62	18–16	Harrah's Cherokee Center (5,367); Asheville, NC
March 6, 2022; 7:00 pm, ESPN	(7)	vs. (1) Furman; Championship	L 79–88	18–17	Harrah's Cherokee Center; Asheville, NC
*Non-conference game. ^{#}Rankings from AP Poll. (#) Tournament seedings in parentheses. All times are in Eastern.

== See also ==
- 2022–23 Chattanooga Mocs women's basketball
