= 2022–23 UNC Greensboro Spartans men's basketball team =

American college basketball season

2022–23 UNC Greensboro Spartans men's basketball
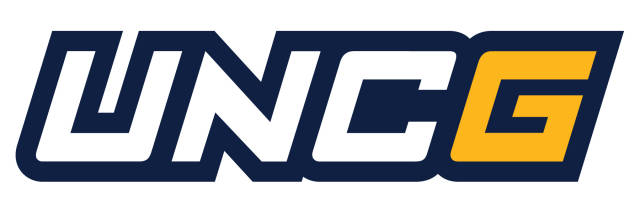
- Conference: Southern Conference
- Record: 20–12 (14–4 SoCon)
- Head coach: Mike Jones (2nd season)
- Assistant coaches: Donny Lind; Bryant Stith; Brett Gilbert
- Home arena: Greensboro Coliseum Complex; Fleming Gymnasium

2022–23 Southern Conference men's basketball standings
	Conf.				Overall
Team	W		L	PCT	W		L	PCT
Furman †	15	–	3	.833	28	–	8	.778
Samford	15	–	3	.833	21	–	11	.656
UNC Greensboro	14	–	4	.778	20	–	12	.625
Western Carolina	10	–	8	.556	18	–	16	.529
East Tennessee State	8	–	10	.444	12	–	20	.375
Wofford	8	–	10	.444	17	–	16	.515
Chattanooga	7	–	11	.389	18	–	17	.514
Mercer	6	–	12	.333	14	–	19	.424
The Citadel	5	–	13	.278	10	–	22	.313
VMI	2	–	16	.111	7	–	25	.219
† 2023 SoCon tournament winner

The 2022–23 UNC Greensboro Spartans men's basketball team represented the University of North Carolina at Greensboro during the 2022–23 NCAA Division I men's basketball season. The Spartans, led by second-year head coach Mike Jones, played their home games at the Greensboro Coliseum and Fleming Gymnasium in Greensboro, North Carolina as members of the Southern Conference (SoCon).

The Spartans finished the 2022–23 NCAA Division I men's basketball season with a record of 20–12, 14–4 in SoCon play, to finish in third place. As the No. 3 seed in the SoCon tournament, they lost to Wofford in the quarterfinals.

Guard Keyshaun Langley was named to both the Southern Conference Coaches and Sports Media Association first team. His brother Kobe Langley, also a guard, was named SoCon Defensive Player of the Year. Guard Keondre Kennedy was named to the Coaches Third Team and coach Mike Jones was named the SoCon Coach of the Year.

== Previous season ==
The Spartans finished the 2021–22 NCAA Division I men's basketball season with a record of 17–14, 9–9 in SoCon play, to finish in a tie for fifth place. As the No. 6 seed in the SoCon tournament, they lost to Samford in the quarterfinals. Guard De'Monte Buckingham was named to the Southern Conference Sports Media Association third team. They accepted an invitation to play in the 2022 College Basketball Invitational tournament where, as a No. 7 seed, they lost to No. 10-seeded Boston University in the first round.

== Offseason ==
=== Departing players ===
Departing players
Name	Number	Position	Height	Weight	Year	Hometown	Notes
De'Monte Buckingham	10	G	6'4"	220	Graduate student	Richmond, VA	Completed college eligibility
Khyre Thompson	12	G	6'6"	190	Junior	Kernersville, NC	Left team for medical reasons
Reggie Raynor	20	G	6'4"	200	Sophomore	Fayetteville, NC	Transferred to Brunswick CC
Kaleb Hunter	44	G	6'4"	190	Senior	Raleigh, NC	Graduated
A.J. Williams	2	G	6'0"	180	Freshman	Henrico, VA	Entered transfer portal
J.C. Tharrington	11	G	6'1"	180	Senior	Charlotte, NC	Transferred to Converse University

=== Incoming transfers ===
Incoming transfers
Name	Position	Height	Weight	Year	Hometown	Previous school
Keondre Kennedy	G	6'6"	180	Graduate student	Atlanta, GA	UMBC
Mikael Brown-Jones	F	6'8"	220	Junior	Philadelphia, PA	VCU
Joryam Saizonou	G	6'3"	182	Sophomore	Almere, Netherlands	St. Bonaventure
Akrum Ahemed	G	6'3"	190	Junior	Hackensack, NJ	Canisius

=== 2022 recruiting class ===
College recruiting information
Name	Hometown	School	Height	Weight	Commit date
Donovan Atwell; SG	Huntersville, NC	Providence Day School	6 ft 5 in (1.96 m)	170 lb (77 kg)	Mar 21, 2022
Donovan Atwell; SG	Recruit ratings: Rivals: 247Sports:				
Cortez Johnson Jr. PF	Baltimore, MD	St. Frances Academy	6 ft 7 in (2.01 m)	190 lb (86 kg)	
Cortez Johnson Jr. PF	Recruit ratings: Rivals: 247Sports:				
Overall recruit ranking:
Note: In many cases, Scout, Rivals, 247Sports, On3, and ESPN may conflict in their listings of height and weight.; In these cases, the average was taken. ESPN grades are on a 100-point scale.; Sources: "2022 Team Ranking". Rivals.

== Roster ==
2020–21 UNC Greensboro Spartans men's basketball team
Players
Coaches

Pos.	#	Name	Height	Weight	Year	Hometown
G	0	Keyshaun Langley	6 ft 1 in (1.85 m)	175 lb (79 kg)	Sr	High Point, NC
F	2	Mikael Brown-Jones	6 ft 8 in (2.03 m)	220 lb (100 kg)	Jr	Philadelphia, PA
G	3	Kobe Langley	6 ft 1 in (1.85 m)	180 lb (82 kg)	Sr	High Point, NC
F	4	Mohammed Abdulsalam	6 ft 9 in (2.06 m)	255 lb (116 kg)	GS	Ibadan, Nigeria
G	11	Keondre Kennedy	6 ft 6 in (1.98 m)	180 lb (82 kg)	GS	Atlanta, GA
G	12	Donovan Atwell	6 ft 5 in (1.96 m)	165 lb (75 kg)	Fr	Huntersville, NC
F	13	Miles Jones (W)	6 ft 6 in (1.98 m)	210 lb (95 kg)	Sr	Radford, VA
F	14	Jalen White	6 ft 5 in (1.96 m)	245 lb (111 kg)	Sr	St. Petersburg, FL
F	15	Cortez Jr. Johnson	6 ft 7 in (2.01 m)	198 lb (90 kg)	Fr	Baltimore, MD
G	20	Joryam Saizonou	6 ft 3 in (1.91 m)	182 lb (83 kg)	So	Almere, Netherlands
F	22	Jalen Breath	6 ft 9 in (2.06 m)	235 lb (107 kg)	RS Fr	Moore, OK
G	24	Dante Treacy	6 ft 0 in (1.83 m)	175 lb (79 kg)	Sr	Orlando, FL
G	25	Jevon Johnson	6 ft 3 in (1.91 m)	170 lb (77 kg)	RS So	Durham, NC
F	33	Bas Leyte	6 ft 10 in (2.08 m)	220 lb (100 kg)	Sr	Bergen op Zoom, Netherlands
G	35	Akrum Ahemed	6 ft 3 in (1.91 m)	190 lb (86 kg)	RS Jr	Hackensack, NJ

Head coach

- Mike Jones (Howard)

Assistant coach(es)

- Donny Lind (Loyola (MD))
- Brett Gilbert (Lebanon Valley)
- Bryant Stith (Virginia)

Legend

- (C) Team captain
- (S) Suspended
- (I) Ineligible
- (W) Walk-on
- Injured
- Current redshirt

Roster
Last update: October 20, 2022

== Schedule and results ==
Date time, TV	Rank^{#}	Opponent^{#}	Result	Record	High points	High rebounds	High assists	Site (attendance) city, state
Non-conference regular season
November 7, 2022*; 5:00 p.m., ESPN+		Johnson & Wales	W 93–60	1–0	16 – Kennedy	11 – Kennedy	6 – Ko. Langley	Fleming Gymnasium (1,102); Greensboro, NC
November 11, 2022*; 7:00 p.m., ACCN		at Miami (FL)	L 65–79	1–1	13 – Brown-Jones	7 – Kennedy	6 – Ko. Langley	Watsco Center (4,831); Coral Gables, FL
November 17, 2022*; 7:00 p.m., ESPN+		Towson	L 53–56	1–2	16 – Ke. Langley	9 – Kennedy	4 – Ko. Langley	Greensboro Coliseum (2,172); Greensboro, NC
November 22, 2022*; 7:00 p.m., ESPN+		UMBC	W 76–72	2–2	24 – Kennedy	8 – Kennedy	4 – Ko. Langley	Greensboro Coliseum (1,257); Greensboro, NC
November 25, 2022*; 4:30 p.m.		vs. Montana State; Northern Classic	W 77–66	3–2	20 – Kennedy	6 – Kennedy	5 – Ke. Langley	Place Bell; Laval, QC
November 26, 2022*; 2:00 p.m.		vs. Hofstra; Northern Classic	L 53–65	3–3	11 – Brown-Jones	6 – tied	5 – Treacy	Place Bell; Laval, QC
November 27, 2022*; 11:00 a.m.		vs. Stephen F. Austin; Northern Classic	L 58–75	3–4	17 – Kennedy	6 – Abdulsalam	9 – Treacy	Place Bell; Laval, QC
November 30, 2022*; 7:00 p.m., ESPN+		at North Carolina A&T; Battle of Market Street	L 56–73	3–5	17 – Treacy	14 – Abdulsalam	2 – tied	Corbett Sports Center (4,704); Greensboro, NC
December 3, 2022*; 4:00 p.m., ESPN+		at Elon	W 65–61	4–5	20 – Brown-Jones	9 – Ko. Langley	6 – Ko. Langley	Schar Center (1,677); Elon, NC
December 6, 2022*; 7:00 p.m., SECN		at No. 9 Arkansas	L 58–65	4–6	12 – Atwell	10 – Abdulsalam	7 – Ko. Langley	Bud Walton Arena (19,200); Fayetteville, AR
December 13, 2022*; 7:00 p.m., ESPN+		Marshall	W 75–67	5–6	20 – Ko. Langley	10 – tied	6 – Treacy	Greensboro Coliseum (1,089); Greensboro, NC
December 18, 2022*; 3:00 p.m., ESPN+		Warren Wilson	W 120–48	6–6	19 – Ke. Langley	13 – Kennedy	6 – Treacy	Fleming Gymnasium; Greensboro, NC
December 22, 2022*; 2:00 p.m., ESPN+		at Eastern Kentucky	L 64–68	6–7	15 – Treacy	8 – Abdulsalam	6 – Ko. Langley	McBrayer Arena (2,683); Richmond, KY
SoCon regular season
December 29, 2022; 2:00 p.m., ESPN+		at Western Carolina	W 72–47	7–7 (1–0)	19 – Brown-Jones	11 – Kennedy	3 – tied	Ramsey Center (1,130); Cullowhee, NC
December 31, 2022; 2:00 p.m., ESPN+		at Wofford	W 73–64	8–7 (2–0)	19 – Kennedy	11 – Brown-Jones	8 – Treacy	Jerry Richardson Indoor Stadium (819); Spartanburg, SC
January 4, 2023; 7:00 p.m., ESPN+		Chattanooga	W 73–61	9–7 (3–0)	19 – Ke. Langley	6 – Abdulsalam	5 – Treacy	Greensboro Coliseum (1,082); Greensboro, NC
January 7, 2023; 4:00 p.m., ESPN+		Samford	L 68–70	9–8 (3–1)	16 – tied	10 – Kennedy	4 – Kennedy	Greensboro Coliseum (1,197); Greensboro, NC
January 11, 2023; 7:00 p.m., ESPN+		at VMI	W 72–57	10–8 (4–1)	25 – Ke. Langley	7 – tied	7 – Treacy	Cameron Hall (560); Lexington, VA
January 14, 2023; 4:00 p.m., ESPN+		at Furman	W 88–80 ^{OT}	11–8 (5–1)	24 – Ke. Langley	7 – tied (3)	6 – Ko. Langley	Timmons Arena (2,507); Greenville, SC
January 19, 2023; 7:00 p.m., ESPN+		The Citadel	W 70–60	12–8 (6–1)	19 – Ke. Langley	7 – Leyte	4 – Ke. Langley	Greensboro Coliseum (1,347); Greensboro, NC
January 21, 2023; 4:00 p.m., ESPN+		Mercer	W 59–48	13–8 (7–1)	17 – Brown-Jones	6 – tied	7 – Ke. Langley	Greensboro Coliseum (1,479); Greensboro, NC
January 25, 2023; 7:00 p.m., ESPN+		VMI	W 62–50	14–8 (8–1)	14 – tied	9 – Leyte	3 – tied (3)	Greensboro Coliseum (1,373); Greensboro, NC
January 29, 2023; 3:00 p.m., ESPN+		Furman	L 57–69	14–9 (8–2)	23 – Abdulsalam	8 – Abdulsalam	6 – Treacy	Greensboro Coliseum (2,419); Greensboro, NC
February 2, 2023; 7:00 p.m., ESPN+		at Mercer	W 69–49	15–9 (9–2)	15 – Abdulsalam	16 – Abdulsalam	4 – Kennedy	Hawkins Arena (2,572); Macon, GA
February 4, 2023; 1:00 p.m., ESPN+		at The Citadel	W 79–59	16–9 (10–2)	19 – Ke. Langley	12 – Abdulsalam	3 – Leyte	McAlister Field House (3,451); Charleston, SC
February 7, 2023; 7:00 p.m., ESPNU		East Tennessee State	W 91–65	17–9 (11–2)	21 – Kennedy	7 – Kennedy	8 – Treacy	Greensboro Coliseum (1,476); Greensboro, NC
February 12, 2023; 3:00 p.m., ESPN+		Wofford	W 97–89 ^{OT}	18–9 (12–2)	27 – Ke. Langley	14 – Abdulsalam	7 – Ko. Langley	Greensboro Coliseum (1,349); Greensboro, NC
February 15, 2023; 7:30 p.m., ESPN+		at Samford	L 71–83	18–10 (12–3)	18 – Kennedy	13 – Abdulsalam	4 – Ko. Langley	Pete Hanna Center (2,416); Homewood, AL
February 18, 2023; 12:00 p.m., CBSSN		at Chattanooga	W 93–76	19–10 (13–3)	16 – Leyte	8 – Kennedy	4 – tied	McKenzie Arena (3,560); Chattanooga, TN
February 22, 2023; 7:00 p.m., ESPN+		Western Carolina	W 71–52	20–10 (14–3)	28 – Ke. Langley	7 – Abdulsalam	5 – Treacy	Greensboro Coliseum; Greensboro, NC
February 25, 2023; 4:00 p.m., ESPN+		at East Tennessee State	L 62–63	20–11 (14–4)	12 – tied	9 – Abdulsalam	3 – Ko. Langley	Freedom Hall Civic Center (3,652); Johnson City, TN
SoCon tournament
March 4, 2023; 8:30 p.m., ESPN+	(3)	vs. (6) Wofford; Quarterfinals	L 66–67	20–12	26 – Kennedy	6 – Kennedy	5 – Ke. Langley	Harrah's Cherokee Center; Asheville, NC
*Non-conference game. ^{#}Rankings from AP poll. (#) Tournament seedings in parentheses. All times are in Eastern.

== Awards and honors ==
=== Southern Conference honors ===
==== SoCon Coaches Coach of the Year ====
- Mike Jones

==== SoCon Coaches Defensive Player of the Year ====
- Kobe Langley

==== SoCon Coaches First Team ====
- Keyshaun Langley

==== SoCon Coaches Third Team ====
- Keondre Kennedy

==== SoCon Sports Media Association First Team ====
- Keyshaun Langley

==== NABC All-District First Team ====
- Keyshaun Langley
