= 2023 Southern Conference men's basketball tournament =

- Classification: Division I
- Season: 2022–23
- Teams: 10
- Site: Harrah's Cherokee Center; Asheville, North Carolina
- Champions: Furman (7th title)
- Winning coach: Bob Richey (1st title)
- Television: ESPN+, Nexstar, ESPNU, ESPNews, ESPN

The 2023 Southern Conference Men's Basketball Tournament was the postseason men's basketball tournament for the Southern Conference for the 2022–23 season. All tournament games were played at the Harrah's Cherokee Center in Asheville, North Carolina, from March 3–6, 2023. The winner of the tournament, Furman, received the conference's automatic bid to the 2023 NCAA Division I Men's Basketball Tournament.

2022–23 Southern Conference men's basketball standings
	Conf.				Overall
Team	W		L	PCT	W		L	PCT
Furman †	15	–	3	.833	28	–	8	.778
Samford	15	–	3	.833	21	–	11	.656
UNC Greensboro	14	–	4	.778	20	–	12	.625
Western Carolina	10	–	8	.556	18	–	16	.529
East Tennessee State	8	–	10	.444	12	–	20	.375
Wofford	8	–	10	.444	17	–	16	.515
Chattanooga	7	–	11	.389	18	–	17	.514
Mercer	6	–	12	.333	14	–	19	.424
The Citadel	5	–	13	.278	10	–	22	.313
VMI	2	–	16	.111	7	–	25	.219
† 2023 SoCon tournament winner

== Seeds ==
All ten teams in the Southern Conference will be eligible to compete in the conference tournament. Teams will be seeded by record within the conference, with a tiebreaker system to seed teams with identical conference records. The top six teams will receive first-round byes.

Seed	School	Conference	Tiebreaker
1	Furman	15–3	2-0 vs. Samford
2	Samford	15–3	0-2 vs. Furman
3	UNC Greensboro	14–4	
4	Western Carolina	10–8	
5	East Tennessee State	8–10	2-0 vs. Wofford
6	Wofford	8–10	0-2 vs. East Tennessee State
7	Chattanooga	7–11	
8	Mercer	6–12	
9	The Citadel	5–13	
10	VMI	2–16	

== Schedule and results ==
Game	Time	Matchup	Score	Television
First round – Friday, March 3
1	5:00 pm	No. 8 Mercer vs. No. 9 The Citadel	66–41	ESPN+
2	7:30 pm	No. 7 Chattanooga vs. No. 10 VMI	92–72	ESPN+
Quarterfinals – Saturday, March 4
3	12:00 pm	No. 1 Furman vs. No. 8 Mercer	73–58	ESPN+/Nexstar
4	2:30 pm	No. 4 Western Carolina vs. No. 5 East Tennessee State	69–57	ESPN+/Nexstar
5	6:00 pm	No. 2 Samford vs. No. 7 Chattanooga	85–82	ESPN+/Nexstar
6	8:30 pm	No. 3 UNC Greensboro vs. No. 6 Wofford	67–66	ESPN+/Nexstar
Semifinals – Sunday, March 5
7	4:00 pm	No. 1 Furman vs. No. 4 Western Carolina	83–80^{OT}	ESPNU
8	6:30 pm	No. 7 Chattanooga vs No. 6 Wofford	74–62	ESPNews
Final – Monday, March 6
9	7:00 pm	No. 1 Furman vs. No. 7 Chattanooga	88–79	ESPN
*Game times in EST. Rankings denote tournament seed

== Bracket ==
First round March 3 ESPN+
8	Mercer	66
9	The Citadel	41
7	Chattanooga	92
10	VMI	72

Quarterfinals; March 4 ESPN+/Nexstar
1	Furman	73
8	Mercer	58
4	Western Carolina	69
5	East Tennessee State	57
2	Samford	82
7	Chattanooga	85
3	UNC Greensboro	66
6	Wofford	67

Semifinals; March 5 ESPNU
1	Furman	83*
4	Western Carolina	80
7	Chattanooga	74
6	Wofford	62

Championship; March 6 ESPN
1	Furman	88
7	Chattanooga	79

== See also ==
- 2023 Southern Conference women's basketball tournament
