= 2022–23 VMI Keydets basketball team =

American college basketball season

2022–23 VMI Keydets basketball
- Conference: Southern Conference
- Record: 7–25 (2–16 SoCon)
- Head coach: Andrew Wilson (1st season)
- Associate head coach: Dave Davis
- Assistant coaches: Keith Chesley; Austin Kenon
- Home arena: Cameron Hall

2022–23 Southern Conference men's basketball standings
	Conf.				Overall
Team	W		L	PCT	W		L	PCT
Furman †	15	–	3	.833	28	–	8	.778
Samford	15	–	3	.833	21	–	11	.656
UNC Greensboro	14	–	4	.778	20	–	12	.625
Western Carolina	10	–	8	.556	18	–	16	.529
East Tennessee State	8	–	10	.444	12	–	20	.375
Wofford	8	–	10	.444	17	–	16	.515
Chattanooga	7	–	11	.389	18	–	17	.514
Mercer	6	–	12	.333	14	–	19	.424
The Citadel	5	–	13	.278	10	–	22	.313
VMI	2	–	16	.111	7	–	25	.219
† 2023 SoCon tournament winner

The 2022–23 VMI Keydets basketball team represented the Virginia Military Institute in the 2022–23 NCAA Division I men's basketball season. The Keydets, led by first-year head coach Andrew Wilson, played their home games in Cameron Hall in Lexington, Virginia as members of the Southern Conference (SoCon).

== Previous season ==
The Keydets finished the 2021–22 season 16–16, 9–9 in SoCon play, to finish in a tie for fifth place. In the SoCon tournament, they were defeated by Wofford in the quarterfinals. The Keydets were invited to the CBI, where they lost in the first round to UNC Wilmington. On March 30, it was announced that head coach Dan Earl was leaving the program to take the head coaching position at Chattanooga. On April 12, the school announced that James Madison assistant Andrew Wilson would be the team's next head coach.

== Roster ==
2022–23 VMI Keydets men's basketball team
Players
Coaches

Pos.	#	Name	Height	Weight	Year	Hometown
G	0	Louis Tang	6 ft 4 in (1.93 m)	195 lb (88 kg)	Sr	Kaohsiung, Taiwan
G	1	Brennan Watkins	5 ft 11 in (1.8 m)	162 lb (73 kg)	So	Kearney, MO
G	2	Taeshaud II Jackson	6 ft 4 in (1.93 m)	210 lb (95 kg)	Fr	Denver, CO
G	3	Asher Woods	6 ft 3 in (1.91 m)	180 lb (82 kg)	Fr	Newnan, GA
G	4	Rickey Jr. Bradley	6 ft 2 in (1.88 m)	185 lb (84 kg)	Fr	Milwaukee, WI
G	10	Tony Jr. Felder	5 ft 10 in (1.78 m)	165 lb (75 kg)	Fr	Boston, MA
G	11	Devin Butler	6 ft 2 in (1.88 m)	195 lb (88 kg)	Jr	Ridgeland, SC
F	14	Sam Wolfe	6 ft 8 in (2.03 m)	214 lb (97 kg)	Sr	Charlotte, NC
G	15	Cooper Sisco	6 ft 5 in (1.96 m)	185 lb (84 kg)	So	Frisco, TX
G	20	Jake Johnston	5 ft 9 in (1.75 m)	155 lb (70 kg)	Jr	Bristol, VA
G	24	Tanner Mans	6 ft 6 in (1.98 m)	187 lb (85 kg)	Jr	Wichita, KS
G	30	Sean Conway	6 ft 5 in (1.96 m)	215 lb (98 kg)	Sr	Fairfield, CT
C	35	KC Etienne	6 ft 8 in (2.03 m)	225 lb (102 kg)	So	Newburgh, NY
C	42	DJ Nussbaum	6 ft 9 in (2.06 m)	230 lb (104 kg)	Jr	Houston, TX
C	44	Tyler Houser	6 ft 9 in (2.06 m)	235 lb (107 kg)	Fr	Camp Hill, PA
G		Josh Tuell	6 ft 0 in (1.83 m)	155 lb (70 kg)	Fr	Marion, VA

Head coach

- Andrew Wilson (Florida State)

Assistant coach(es)

- Dave Davis (Warren Wilson)
- Keith Chesley (Maine–Augusta)
- Austin Kenon (VMI)

Legend

- (C) Team captain
- (S) Suspended
- (I) Ineligible
- (W) Walk-on
- Injured
- Current redshirt

Roster
Last update: January 1, 2023

== Schedule and results ==
Date time, TV	Rank^{#}	Opponent^{#}	Result	Record	Site (attendance) city, state
Non-conference regular season
November 7, 2022*; 7:00 p.m., ESPN+		at Richmond	L 48–69	0–1	Robins Center (6,049); Richmond, VA
November 10, 2022*; 7:00 p.m., ESPN+		Penn State New Kensington	W 100–58	1–1	Cameron Hall (375); Lexington, VA
November 13, 2022*; 2:00 p.m., ESPN+		at Davidson	L 71–75	1–2	John M. Belk Arena (2,991); Davidson, NC
November 18, 2022*; 5:00 p.m., ESPN+		at Longwood; JK54 Classic	L 58–90	1–3	Willett Hall (1,232); Farmville, VA
November 19, 2022*; 7:00 p.m., ESPN+		vs. SIU Edwardsville; JK54 Classic	L 67–93	1–4	Willett Hall (132); Farmville, VA
November 20, 2022*; 3:30 p.m., ESPN+		vs. Fairleigh Dickinson; JK54 Classic	L 89–93	1–5	Willett Hall (132); Farmville, VA
November 26, 2022*; 1:00 p.m., ESPN+		Regent	W 108–58	2–5	Cameron Hall (287); Lexington, VA
November 29, 2022*; 7:00 p.m., ESPN+		at Presbyterian	L 57–72	2–6	Templeton Physical Education Center (380); Clinton, SC
December 3, 2022*; 1:00 p.m., ESPN+		Navy	W 80–72	3–6	Cameron Hall (1,250); Lexington, VA
December 7, 2022*; 7:00 p.m., ESPN+		Carlow	W 106–67	4–6	Cameron Hall (522); Lexington, VA
December 10, 2022*; 1:00 p.m., ESPN+		Radford	W 77–74	5–6	Cameron Hall (2,746); Lexington, VA
December 13, 2022*; 6:00 p.m., ESPN+		at American	L 61–69	5–7	Bender Arena (758); Washington, D.C.
December 22, 2022*; 12:00 p.m., ESPN+		at Fordham	L 77–80 ^{OT}	5–8	Rose Hill Gymnasium; The Bronx, NY
SoCon regular season
December 29, 2022; 7:00 p.m., ESPN+		at Furman	L 62–85	5–9 (0–1)	Timmons Arena (2,067); Greenville, SC
December 31, 2022; 1:00 p.m., ESPN+		East Tennessee State	L 50–64	5–10 (0–2)	Cameron Hall (750); Lexington, VA
January 4, 2023; 8:00 p.m., ESPN+		at Samford	L 78–87	5–11 (0–3)	Pete Hanna Center (2,017); Homewood, AL
January 7, 2023; 2:00 p.m., ESPN+		at Chattanooga	L 78–85	5–12 (0–4)	McKenzie Arena (3,556); Chattanooga, TN
January 11, 2023; 7:00 p.m., ESPN+		UNC Greensboro	L 57–72	5–13 (0–5)	Cameron Hall (550); Lexington, VA
January 14, 2023; 7:00 p.m., ESPN+		at Wofford	L 67–86	5–14 (0–6)	Jerry Richardson Indoor Stadium (1,470); Spartanburg, SC
January 19, 2023; 7:00 p.m., ESPN+		Mercer	L 61–69	5–15 (0–7)	Cameron Hall (550); Lexington, VA
January 21, 2023; 1:00 p.m., ESPN+		The Citadel	L 52–60	5–16 (0–8)	Cameron Hall (3,625); Lexington, VA
January 25, 2023; 7:00 p.m., ESPN+		at UNC Greensboro	L 50–62	5–17 (0–9)	Greensboro Coliseum (1,373); Greensboro, NC
January 28, 2023; 1:00 p.m., ESPN+		Western Carolina	L 65–71	5–18 (0–10)	Cameron Hall (3,265); Lexington, VA
February 2, 2023; 7:00 p.m., ESPN+		at The Citadel	W 75–69	6–18 (1–10)	McAlister Field House (1,682); Charleston, SC
February 4, 2023; 1:00 p.m., ESPN+		at Mercer	L 54–80	6–19 (1–11)	Hawkins Arena (3,107); Macon, GA
February 8, 2023; 7:00 p.m., ESPN+		Furman	L 63–94	6–20 (1–12)	Cameron Hall (450); Lexington, VA
February 10, 2023; 7:00 p.m., ESPN+		at East Tennessee State	L 65–69	6–21 (1–13)	Freedom Hall Civic Center (3,063); Johnson City, TN
February 15, 2023; 7:00 p.m., ESPN+		Chattanooga	L 58–78	6–22 (1–14)	Cameron Hall (790); Lexington, VA
February 18, 2023; 1:00 p.m., ESPN+		Samford	L 61–96	6–23 (1–15)	Cameron Hall (3,229); Lexington, VA
February 22, 2023; 7:00 p.m., ESPN+		Wofford	W 87–83 ^{OT}	7–23 (2–15)	Cameron Hall (550); Lexington, VA
February 25, 2023; 4:00 p.m., ESPN+		at Western Carolina	L 66–85	7–24 (2–16)	Ramsey Center (3,586); Cullowhee, NC
SoCon tournament
March 3, 2023; 7:30 p.m., ESPN+	(10)	vs. (7) Chattanooga; First round	L 72–92	7–25	Harrah's Cherokee Center (2,765); Asheville, NC
*Non-conference game. ^{#}Rankings from AP poll. (#) Tournament seedings in parentheses. All times are in Eastern.
