= 2022–23 Furman Paladins men's basketball team =

2022–23 Furman Paladins men's basketball

SoCon regular-season and tournament champions

NCAA tournament, Second round
- Conference: Southern Conference
- Record: 28–8 (15–3 SoCon)
- Head coach: Bob Richey (6th season)
- Associate head coach: Jeremy Growe
- Assistant coaches: Tim Johnson; Chad Warner
- Home arena: Timmons Arena; Bon Secours Wellness Arena

2022–23 Southern Conference men's basketball standings
	Conf.				Overall
Team	W		L	PCT	W		L	PCT
Furman †	15	–	3	.833	28	–	8	.778
Samford	15	–	3	.833	21	–	11	.656
UNC Greensboro	14	–	4	.778	20	–	12	.625
Western Carolina	10	–	8	.556	18	–	16	.529
East Tennessee State	8	–	10	.444	12	–	20	.375
Wofford	8	–	10	.444	17	–	16	.515
Chattanooga	7	–	11	.389	18	–	17	.514
Mercer	6	–	12	.333	14	–	19	.424
The Citadel	5	–	13	.278	10	–	22	.313
VMI	2	–	16	.111	7	–	25	.219
† 2023 SoCon tournament winner

The 2022–23 Furman Paladins men's basketball team represented Furman University in the 2022–23 NCAA Division I men's basketball season. The Paladins, led by sixth-year head coach Bob Richey, played their home games at Timmons Arena and Bon Secours Wellness Arena in Greenville, South Carolina as members of the Southern Conference (SoCon). They improved on their 12–6 SoCon record from last season and finished the regular season with a 15–3 record, to finish in first place. In the SoCon tournament, they defeated Mercer and Western Carolina to reach the championship game. In the championship game, they defeated defending SoCon tournament champion Chattanooga to make the NCAA tournament, the first time since 1980 they accomplished this. They went on to upset Virginia in the first round of the NCAA tournament, only to lose to the eventual national runner-up San Diego State in the second round.

== Previous season ==
The Paladins finished the 2021–22 season 22–12, 12–6 in SoCon play, to finish in second place. They defeated Mercer and Samford to advance to the SoCon tournament championship game. There, they lost to Chattanooga in overtime.

== Roster ==
2022–23 Furman Paladins men's basketball team
Players
Coaches

Pos.	#	Name	Height	Weight	Year	Hometown
G	0	Blake Harris	6 ft 0 in (1.83 m)	180 lb (82 kg)	Jr	Greenville, SC
G	1	JP Pegues	6 ft 1 in (1.85 m)	180 lb (82 kg)	So	Nashville, TN
F	2	Davis Molnar	6 ft 6 in (1.98 m)	215 lb (98 kg)	Fr	Fayetteville, NC
G	3	Mike Bothwell	6 ft 3 in (1.91 m)	195 lb (88 kg)	Sr	Cleveland Heights, OH
F	4	Ben VanderWal	6 ft 7 in (2.01 m)	210 lb (95 kg)	Fr	Elmhurst, IL
G	5	Marcus Foster	6 ft 4 in (1.93 m)	200 lb (91 kg)	Jr	Atlanta, GA
G	11	Carter Whitt	6 ft 3 in (1.91 m)	185 lb (84 kg)	So	Raleigh, NC
F	12	Jonny Lawrence	6 ft 10 in (2.08 m)	200 lb (91 kg)	RS Jr	Orlando, FL
F	13	Garrett Hien	6 ft 9 in (2.06 m)	215 lb (98 kg)	Jr	Concord, NC
G	14	Rett Lister	6 ft 1 in (1.85 m)	170 lb (77 kg)	Sr	Easley, SC
F	15	Tyrese Hughey	6 ft 6 in (1.98 m)	220 lb (100 kg)	So	Columbus, OH
F	20	Jalen Slawson	6 ft 7 in (2.01 m)	215 lb (98 kg)	Sr	Summerville, SC
G	22	Joe Anderson	6 ft 0 in (1.83 m)	175 lb (79 kg)	Jr	Maryville, TN
F	24	Alex Williams	6 ft 5 in (1.96 m)	235 lb (107 kg)	So	Xenia, OH
F	35	James Repass	6 ft 10 in (2.08 m)	250 lb (113 kg)	So	Jacksonville, FL

Head coach

- Bob Richey (North Greenville)

Assistant coach(es)

- Jeremy Growe (Indiana)
- Tim Johnson (Wofford)
- Chad Warner (Georgia)

Legend

- (C) Team captain
- (S) Suspended
- (I) Ineligible
- (W) Walk-on
- Injured
- Current redshirt

Roster
Last update: December 5, 2022

== Schedule and results ==
Date time, TV	Rank^{#}	Opponent^{#}	Result	Record	Site (attendance) city, state
Non-conference regular season
November 7, 2022*; 7:00 p.m., ESPN+		North Greenville	W 91–55	1–0	Timmons Arena (2,027); Greenville, SC
November 11, 2022*; 7:00 p.m., ESPN+		Belmont	W 89–74	2–0	Timmons Arena (2,092); Greenville, SC
November 17, 2022*; 11:30 a.m., ESPNU		vs. Penn State; Charleston Classic first round	L 68–73	2–1	TD Arena; Charleston, SC
November 18, 2022*; 2:30 p.m., ESPNU		vs. Old Dominion; Charleston Classic Consolation second round	L 77–82	2–2	TD Arena (2,030); Charleston, SC
November 20, 2022*; 10:30 a.m., ESPNews		vs. South Carolina; Charleston Classic 7th-place game	W 79–60	3–2	TD Arena; Charleston, SC
November 25, 2022*; 2:00 p.m., ESPN+		Tusculum	W 102–74	4–2	Timmons Arena (1,517); Greenville, SC
November 29, 2022*; 6:30 p.m., ESPN+		at Appalachian State	W 65–61	5–2	Holmes Center (1,976); Boone, NC
December 3, 2022*; 12:00 p.m., ESPN+		South Carolina State	W 88–76	6–2	Timmons Arena (1,847); Greenville, SC
December 6, 2022*; 7:00 p.m., ESPN+		High Point	L 82–85	6–3	Timmons Arena (1,427); Greenville, SC
December 10, 2022*; 4:00 p.m., ESPN+		Winthrop	W 82–67	7–3	Timmons Arena (2,017); Greenville, SC
December 13, 2022*; 6:30 p.m., ACCN		at NC State	L 73–92	7–4	PNC Arena (9,996); Raleigh, NC
December 17, 2022*; 4:30 p.m., Field of 68		Stephen F. Austin; Greenville Winter Invitational	W 72–70	8–4	Bon Secours Wellness Arena (4,117); Greenville, SC
December 19, 2022*; 7:00 p.m., ESPN+		Anderson	W 106–79	9–4	Timmons Arena (1,587); Greenville, SC
SoCon regular season
December 29, 2022; 7:00 p.m., ESPN+		VMI	W 85–62	10–4 (1–0)	Timmons Arena (2,067); Greenville, SC
December 31, 2022; 4:00 p.m., ESPN+		at Western Carolina	L 67–79	10–5 (1–1)	Ramsey Center (1,060); Cullowhee, NC
January 4, 2023; 7:00 p.m., ESPN+		The Citadel	W 97–72	11–5 (2–1)	Timmons Arena (1,637); Greenville, SC
January 7, 2023; 4:00 p.m., ESPN+		at East Tennessee State	W 70–56	12–5 (3–1)	Freedom Hall Civic Center (4,136); Johnson City, TN
January 11, 2023; 7:00 p.m., ESPN+		at Mercer	W 84–66	13–5 (4–1)	Hawkins Arena (1,727); Macon, GA
January 14, 2023; 4:00 p.m., ESPN+		UNC Greensboro	L 80–88 ^{OT}	13–6 (4–2)	Timmons Arena (2,507); Greenville, SC
January 18, 2023; 7:00 p.m., ESPN+		at Chattanooga	W 77–69	14–6 (5–2)	McKenzie Arena (3,402); Chattanooga, TN
January 22, 2023; 4:00 p.m., ESPNU		at Wofford	W 96–82	15–6 (6–2)	Jerry Richardson Indoor Stadium (2,958); Spartanburg, SC
January 25, 2023; 7:00 p.m., ESPN+		Samford	W 91–84 ^{OT}	16–6 (7–2)	Timmons Arena (1,857); Greenville, SC
January 29, 2023; 3:00 p.m., ESPN+		at UNC Greensboro	W 69–57	17–6 (8–2)	Greensboro Coliseum (2,419); Greensboro, NC
February 1, 2023; 7:00 p.m., ESPN+		Chattanooga	W 79–58	18–6 (9–2)	Timmons Arena (1,627); Greenville, SC
February 4, 2023; 6:00 p.m., CBSSN/ESPN+		Wofford	W 80–67	19–6 (10–2)	Bon Secours Wellness Arena (6,199); Greenville, SC
February 8, 2023; 7:00 p.m., ESPN+		at VMI	W 94–63	20–6 (11–2)	Cameron Hall (450); Lexington, VA
February 11, 2023; 2:00 p.m., ESPN+		Western Carolina	W 93–59	21–6 (12–2)	Timmons Arena (2,577); Greenville, SC
February 15, 2023; 7:00 p.m., ESPN+		at The Citadel	L 65–69	21–7 (12–3)	McAlister Field House (1,737); Charleston, SC
February 19, 2023; 6:00 p.m., ESPNU		East Tennessee State	W 83–79	22–7 (13–3)	Timmons Arena (2,129); Greenville, SC
February 22, 2023; 7:00 p.m., ESPN+		Mercer	W 70–67	23–7 (14–3)	Timmons Arena (1,827); Greenville, SC
February 25, 2023; 3:00 p.m., ESPN+		at Samford	W 93–79	24–7 (15–3)	Pete Hanna Center (3,562); Homewood, AL
SoCon tournament
March 4, 2023; 11:00 a.m., ESPN+	(1)	vs. (8) Mercer; Quarterfinal	W 73–58	25–7	Harrah's Cherokee Center; Asheville, NC
March 5, 2023; 4:00 p.m., ESPNU	(1)	vs. (4) Western Carolina; Semifinal	W 83–80	26–7	Harrah's Cherokee Center; Asheville, NC
March 6, 2023; 7:00 p.m., ESPN	(1)	vs. (7) Chattanooga; Championship	W 88–79	27–7	Harrah's Cherokee Center; Asheville, NC
NCAA tournament
March 16, 2023*; 12:40 p.m., TruTV	(13 S)	vs. (4 S) No. 14 Virginia; First round	W 68–67	28–7	Amway Center; Orlando, FL
March 18, 2023*; 12:10 p.m., CBS	(13 S)	vs. (5 S) No. 18 San Diego State; Second round	L 52–75	28–8	Amway Center (17,298); Orlando, FL
*Non-conference game. ^{#}Rankings from AP poll. (#) Tournament seedings in parentheses. S=South. All times are in Eastern.
