= 2022–23 Samford Bulldogs men's basketball team =

American college basketball season

2022–23 Samford Bulldogs men's basketball

SoCon regular season co–champions
- Conference: Southern Conference
- Record: 21–11 (15–3 SoCon)
- Head coach: Bucky McMillan (3rd season)
- Assistant coaches: Mitch Cole; Danny Young; Neb Exantus
- Home arena: Pete Hanna Center

2022–23 Southern Conference men's basketball standings
	Conf.				Overall
Team	W		L	PCT	W		L	PCT
Furman †	15	–	3	.833	28	–	8	.778
Samford	15	–	3	.833	21	–	11	.656
UNC Greensboro	14	–	4	.778	20	–	12	.625
Western Carolina	10	–	8	.556	18	–	16	.529
East Tennessee State	8	–	10	.444	12	–	20	.375
Wofford	8	–	10	.444	17	–	16	.515
Chattanooga	7	–	11	.389	18	–	17	.514
Mercer	6	–	12	.333	14	–	19	.424
The Citadel	5	–	13	.278	10	–	22	.313
VMI	2	–	16	.111	7	–	25	.219
† 2023 SoCon tournament winner

The 2022–23 Samford Bulldogs men's basketball team represented Samford University in the 2022–23 NCAA Division I men's basketball season. The Bulldogs, led by third-year head coach Bucky McMillan, played their home games at the Pete Hanna Center in Homewood, Alabama as a member of the Southern Conference.

== Previous season ==
The Bulldogs finished the 2021–22 season 21–11, 10–8 in SoCon play to finish in a tie for third place. As the No. 3 seed in the SoCon tournament, they defeated UNC Greensboro, before losing to Furman in the semifinals.

== Roster ==
2022–23 Samford Bulldogs men's basketball team
Players
Coaches

Pos.	#	Name	Height	Weight	Year	Hometown
G	0	Ques Glover	6 ft 0 in (1.83 m)	180 lb (82 kg)	Jr	Knoxville, Tennessee
G	1	Bubba Parham	5 ft 11 in (1.8 m)	165 lb (75 kg)	Sr	Snellville, Georgia
G	2	Jaden Campbell	6 ft 5 in (1.96 m)	205 lb (93 kg)	Jr	Brampton, Ontario
G	3	Jaron Rillie	6 ft 3 in (1.91 m)	165 lb (75 kg)	So	Sydney, Australia
F	4	Jermaine Marshall	6 ft 6 in (1.98 m)	225 lb (102 kg)	Jr	Brighton, Alabama
G	5	A.J. Staton-McCray	6 ft 5 in (1.96 m)	190 lb (86 kg)	So	Delray Beach, Florida
G	10	Owen LaRocca	6 ft 1 in (1.85 m)	150 lb (68 kg)	So	Sugar Land, Texas
G	11	Marcellus Vail	6 ft 2 in (1.88 m)	195 lb (88 kg)	So	Shelbyville, Kentucky
F	12	Daniel Lobach	6 ft 7 in (2.01 m)	190 lb (86 kg)	RS So	Durham, North Carolina
G	13	Quinn Richey	6 ft 5 in (1.96 m)	205 lb (93 kg)	Jr	Johns Creek, Georgia
F	14	Achor Achor	6 ft 9 in (2.06 m)	222 lb (101 kg)	So	Melbourne, Australia
F	15	Grayson Walters	6 ft 5 in (1.96 m)	210 lb (95 kg)	So	Mountain Brook, Alabama
G	21	Britton Johnson	6 ft 4 in (1.93 m)	185 lb (84 kg)	Sr	Mountain Brook, Alabama
F	22	Logan Dye	6 ft 9 in (2.06 m)	240 lb (109 kg)	Sr	Haleyville, Alabama
G	23	Cooper Kaifes	6 ft 4 in (1.93 m)	205 lb (93 kg)	RS Jr	Shawnee, Kansas
G	24	Brody Boyer	6 ft 4 in (1.93 m)	210 lb (95 kg)	Jr	Palm Bay, Florida
F	25	Nathan Johnson	6 ft 7 in (2.01 m)	205 lb (93 kg)	Sr	Adel, Iowa
F	31	Joshua Hughes	6 ft 5 in (1.96 m)	200 lb (91 kg)	Fr	Woodstock, Georgia
G	32	Clay Holmes	6 ft 2 in (1.88 m)	235 lb (107 kg)	So	Brentwood, Tennessee
G	33	Charlie Morrison	6 ft 0 in (1.83 m)	190 lb (86 kg)	So	Athens, Alabama

Head coach

- Bucky McMillan (Birmingham–Southern)

Assistant coach(es)

- Mitch Cole (Montana State Billings)
- Danny Young (Grand Canyon)
- Neb Exantus (Southern New Hampshire)

Legend

- (C) Team captain
- (S) Suspended
- (I) Ineligible
- (W) Walk-on
- Injured
- Current redshirt

Roster
Last update: December 2, 2022

== Schedule and results ==
Date time, TV	Rank^{#}	Opponent^{#}	Result	Record	High points	High rebounds	High assists	Site (attendance) city, state
Non-conference regular season
November 7, 2022*; 7:00 pm, ESPN+		Anderson (SC)	W 109–85	1–0	19 – Marshall	7 – 2 Tied	5 – Rillie	Pete Hanna Center (2,931); Homewood, AL
November 10, 2022*; 6:30 pm, ESPN+		Spring Hill	W 80–61	2–0	18 – 2 Tied	9 – Dye	3 – 2 Tied	Pete Hanna Center (2,415); Homewood, AL
November 12, 2022*; 2:00 pm, ESPN+		Belhaven	W 90–38	3–0	15 – Marshall	8 – Marshall	3 – Parham	Pete Hanna Center (1,833); Homewood, AL
November 17, 2022*; 7:00 pm, YouTube		at Alabama A&M	W 84–64	4–0	18 – Achor	8 – Achor	2 – Kaifes	Elmore Gymnasium (1,800); Huntsville, AL
November 20, 2022*; 2:00 pm, ESPN+		Texas Southern	W 78–63	5–0	18 – Glover	7 – Parham	4 – 2 Tied	Pete Hanna Center (2,333); Homewood, AL
November 23, 2022*; 2:00 pm, ESPN+		Valparaiso	W 79–49	6–0	12 – 2 Tied	6 – Marshall	3 – Marshall	Pete Hanna Center (1,735); Homewood, AL
November 25, 2022*; 2:00 pm, ESPN+		Louisiana Tech	L 76–79	6–1	26 – Glover	4 – 4 Tied	4 – Glover	Pete Hanna Center (1,731); Homewood, AL
November 27, 2022*; 2:00 pm, ESPN+		Tennessee Southern	L 82–84	6–2	18 – Campbell	10 – Achor	3 – Rillie	Pete Hanna Center (1,317); Homewood, AL
November 30, 2022*; 8:00 pm, FS2		at DePaul	L 98–103 ^{OT}	6–3	23 – Dye	10 – Parham	7 – Parham	Wintrust Arena (2,342); Chicago, IL
December 4, 2022*; 1:00 pm, ESPN+		at UCF	L 77–80 ^{OT}	6–4	15 – 2 Tied	7 – Dye	5 – 2 Tied	Addition Financial Arena (4,052); Orlando, FL
December 10, 2022*; 7:00 pm, ESPN+		at Louisiana	L 58–75	6–5	12 – Campbell	7 – Marshall	4 – Rillie	Cajundome (2,653); Lafayette, LA
December 17, 2022*; 2:00 pm, YouTube		at South Carolina State	L 61–62	6–6	16 – Dye	10 – Achor	5 – Rillie	SHM Memorial Center (300); Orangeburg, SC
December 21, 2022*; 6:30 pm, ESPN+		at Belmont	L 56–79	6–7	15 – Tied	7 – Marshall	3 – Parham	Curb Event Center (2,084); Nashville, TN
SoCon regular season
December 28, 2022; 6:00 pm, ESPNU		Mercer	W 78–69	7–7 (1–0)	25 – Marshall	7 – Marshall	10 – Rillie	Pete Hanna Center (2,113); Homewood, AL
December 31, 2022; 12:00 pm, ESPN+		at The Citadel	W 75–63	8–7 (2–0)	20 – Dye	10 – Marshall	3 – Tied	McAlister Field House (871); Charleston, SC
January 4, 2023; 6:30 pm, ESPN+		VMI	W 87–78	9–7 (3–0)	19 – Dye	10 – Marshall	6 – Marshall	Pete Hanna Center (2,017); Homewood, AL
January 7, 2023; 3:00 pm, ESPN+		at UNC Greensboro	W 70–68	10–7 (4–0)	17 – Tied	8 – Tied	4 – Dye	Greensboro Coliseum (1,197); Greensboro, NC
January 11, 2023; 7:00 pm, ESPN+		Wofford	W 83–58	11–7 (5–0)	19 – Dye	6 – Achor	9 – Rillie	Pete Hanna Center (3,217); Homewood, AL
January 14, 2023; 5:00 pm, ESPNU		Chattanooga	W 75-74	12–7 (6–0)	23 – Dye	9 – Marshall	5 – Dye	Pete Hanna Center (3,027); Homewood, AL
January 18, 2023; 6:00 pm, ESPN+		at East Tennessee State	W 69–59	13–7 (7–0)	19 – Dye	12 – Marshall	3 – Tied	Freedom Hall Civic Center (2,894); Johnson City, TN
January 21, 2023; 5:00 pm, ESPN+		Western Carolina	W 74–65	14–7 (8–0)	20 – Glover	12 – Marshall	2 – Tied	Pete Hanna Center (3,513); Homewood, AL
January 25, 2023; 6:00 pm, ESPN+		at Furman	L 84–91 ^{OT}	14–8 (8–1)	19 – Dye	7 – Johnson	6 – Parham	Timmons Arena (1,857); Greenville, SC
January 28, 2023; 1:00 pm, CBSSN/ESPN+		at Wofford	L 77–85	14–9 (8–2)	20 – Glover	7 – Marshall	3 – Glover	Jerry Richardson Indoor Stadium (1,866); Spartanburg, SC
February 1, 2023; 6:00 pm, ESPN+		at Western Carolina	W 85–77	15–9 (9–2)	24 – Dye	10 – Staton-McCray	2 – Parham	Ramsey Center (1,787); Cullowhee, NC
February 4, 2023; 2:00 pm, ESPN+		East Tennessee State	W 73–62	16–9 (10–2)	22 – Staton-McCray	6 – Staton-McCray	4 – Glover	Pete Hanna Center (2,836); Homewood, AL
February 8, 2023; 6:00 pm, ESPN+		at Mercer	W 70–69 ^{OT}	17–9 (11–2)	22 – Glover	8 – Staton-McCray	2 – Parham	Hawkins Arena (2,872); Macon, GA
February 11, 2023; 2:00 pm, ESPN+		The Citadel	W 76–70	18–9 (12–2)	23 – Marshall	7 – Marshall	2 – Tied	Pete Hanna Center (3,100); Homewood, AL
February 15, 2023; 6:30 pm, ESPN+		UNC Greensboro	W 83–71	19–9 (13–2)	21 – Parham	7 – Staton-McCray	4 – Glover	Pete Hanna Center (2,416); Homewood, AL
February 18, 2023; 12:00 pm, ESPN+		at VMI	W 96–61	20–9 (14–2)	19 – Parham	7 – Marshall	8 – Rillie	Cameron Hall (3,229); Lexington, VA
February 22, 2023; 6:00 pm, ESPN+		at Chattanooga	W 75–70	21–9 (15–2)	25 – Marshall	8 – Marshall	5 – Parham	McKenzie Arena (3,189); Chattanooga, TN
February 25, 2023; 2:00 pm, ESPN+		Furman	L 79–93	21–10 (15–3)	27 – Glover	8 – Marshall	4 – Glover	Pete Hanna Center (3,562); Homewood, AL
SoCon tournament
March 4, 2023; 5:00 pm, ESPN+	(2)	vs. (7) Chattanooga; Quarterfinals	L 82–85	21–11	27 – Marshall	8 – Marshall	3 – Tied	Harrah's Cherokee Center; Asheville, NC
*Non-conference game. ^{#}Rankings from AP Poll. (#) Tournament seedings in parentheses. All times are in Central.
