= 2022–23 Towson Tigers men's basketball team =

American college basketball season

2022–23 Towson Tigers men's basketball
- Conference: Colonial Athletic Association
- Record: 21–12 (12–6 CAA)
- Head coach: Pat Skerry (12th season)
- Associate head coach: Pat O'Connell
- Assistant coaches: Parfait Bitee; Chris Conway
- Home arena: SECU Arena

2022–23 CAA men's basketball standings
	Conf.				Overall
Team	W		L	PCT	W		L	PCT
Hofstra	16	–	2	.889	25	–	10	.714
Charleston †	16	–	2	.889	31	–	4	.886
Towson	12	–	6	.667	21	–	12	.636
UNC Wilmington	12	–	6	.667	24	–	10	.706
Drexel	10	–	8	.556	17	–	15	.531
Delaware	8	–	10	.444	17	–	16	.515
North Carolina A&T	8	–	10	.444	13	–	19	.406
William & Mary	7	–	11	.389	13	–	20	.394
Elon	6	–	12	.333	8	–	24	.250
Stony Brook	6	–	12	.333	11	–	22	.333
Northeastern	6	–	12	.333	10	–	20	.333
Hampton	5	–	13	.278	8	–	24	.250
Monmouth	5	–	13	.278	7	–	26	.212
† 2023 CAA tournament winner

The 2022–23 Towson Tigers men's basketball team represented Towson University in the 2022–23 NCAA Division I men's basketball season. The Tigers, led by 12th-year head coach Pat Skerry, played their home games at the SECU Arena in Towson, Maryland as members of the Colonial Athletic Association (CAA).

== Previous season ==
The Tigers finished the 2021–22 season 25–9, 15–3 in CAA play, to finish as CAA regular-season co-champions, alongside UNC Wilmington. As the top seed in the CAA tournament, they defeated Northeastern in the quarterfinals, before being upset by No. 5 seed and eventual tournament champions Delaware in the semifinals. As a regular-season conference champion who failed to win their conference tournament, the Tigers earned an automatic bid to the NIT, where they lost in the first round to Wake Forest.

== Roster ==
2022–23 Towson Tigers men's basketball team
Players
Coaches

Pos.	#	Name	Height	Weight	Year	Previous school	Hometown
G	0	Ryan Conway	6 ft 1 in (1.85 m)	190 lb (86 kg)	RS Fr	Seton Hall	Baltimore, MD
G/F	1	Sekou Sylla	6 ft 5 in (1.96 m)	220 lb (100 kg)	GS	Nova Southeastern	Brooklyn, NY
F	3	Tyler Coleman	6 ft 7 in (2.01 m)	220 lb (100 kg)	So	Paul VI HS	Woodbridge, VA
G	4	Dylan Williamson	6 ft 1 in (1.85 m)	175 lb (79 kg)	Fr	Our Lady of Good Counsel HS	Upper Marlboro, MD
G/F	5	Christian May	6 ft 5 in (1.96 m)	205 lb (93 kg)	Fr	Bishop O'Connell HS	Edinburg, VA
G	10	Rahdir Hicks	6 ft 0 in (1.83 m)	180 lb (82 kg)	So	Malvern Prep	Coatesville, PA
G	11	Jason Gibson	6 ft 1 in (1.85 m)	185 lb (84 kg)	Sr	Sidwell Friends School	Severna Park, MD
F/C	13	Chase Paar	6 ft 10 in (2.08 m)	260 lb (118 kg)	Sr	George Washington	Mount Airy, MD
G	22	Nygal Russell	6 ft 4 in (1.93 m)	210 lb (95 kg)	GS	Southeast Missouri State	Houston, TX
G	25	Nicolas Timberlake	6 ft 4 in (1.93 m)	205 lb (93 kg)	GS	Kimball Union Academy	Braintree, MA
F	30	Cole Paar	6 ft 9 in (2.06 m)	230 lb (104 kg)	Fr	Glenelg Country School	Mount Airy, MD
F	32	Charles Thompson	6 ft 7 in (2.01 m)	245 lb (111 kg)	Sr	St. Stephen's & St. Agnes School	Fort Washington, MD
G	33	Brandon Held	6 ft 3 in (1.91 m)	185 lb (84 kg)	RS So	Marriotts Ridge HS	Marriottsville, MD
F/C	35	Chris Biekeu	6 ft 7 in (2.01 m)	235 lb (107 kg)	Jr	Vanier College	Montreal, QC
F	42	Malik Missouri	6 ft 6 in (1.98 m)	200 lb (91 kg)	So	Gilman School	Baltimore, MD
G	45	Olugbemi Joseph	6 ft 4 in (1.93 m)	200 lb (91 kg)	RS So	Bowie HS	Bowie, MD
G	55	Cam Holden	6 ft 5 in (1.96 m)	200 lb (91 kg)	RS Sr	UT Martin	Forsyth, GA

Head coach

- Pat Skerry (Tufts)

Assistant coach(es)

- Pat O'Connell (Johns Hopkins)
- Parfait Bitee (Rhode Island)
- Chris Conway (York College)

Legend

- (C) Team captain
- (S) Suspended
- (I) Ineligible
- (W) Walk-on
- Injured
- Current redshirt

Roster
Last update: January 10, 2023

== Schedule and results ==
Date time, TV	Rank^{#}	Opponent^{#}	Result	Record	Site (attendance) city, state
Exhibition
October 29, 2022*; 1:00 p.m., ESPN+		at Saint Joseph's	L 76–78	–	Hagan Arena (634); Philadelphia, PA
Non-conference regular season
November 7, 2022*; 7:00 p.m., FloHoops		Albany	W 67–62	1–0	SECU Arena (3,242); Towson, MD
November 10, 2022*; 7:00 p.m., NESN+/ESPN+		at UMass	W 67–55	2–0	Mullins Center (4,435); Amherst, MA
November 13, 2022*; 4:00 p.m., ESPN+		at Penn	W 80–74	3–0	The Palestra (1,539); Philadelphia, PA
November 17, 2022*; 7:00 p.m., ESPN+		at UNC Greensboro	W 56–53	4–0	Greensboro Coliseum (2,172); Greensboro, NC
November 22, 2022*; 7:00 p.m., NBCSWA/FloHoops		Coppin State	W 83–67	5–0	SECU Arena (1,732); Towson, MD
November 25, 2022*; 4:00 p.m., BeTheBeast Event Live+		vs. Fairfield; Hostilo Hoops Community Classic	L 69–74	5–1	Enmarket Arena (331); Savannah, GA
November 26, 2022*; 2:30 p.m., BeTheBeast Event Live+		vs. South Alabama; Hostilo Hoops Community Classic	W 62–60	6–1	Enmarket Arena (233); Savannah, GA
November 27, 2022*; 5:00 p.m., BeTheBeast Event Live+		vs. Mercer; Hostilo Hoops Community Classic	W 70–60	7–1	Enmarket Arena (215); Savannah, GA
December 2, 2022*; 7:00 p.m., NEC Front Row		at LIU	W 74–64	8–1	Steinberg Wellness Center (310); Brooklyn, NY
December 7, 2022*; 9:00 p.m., ACCRSN		at Clemson	L 75–80	8–2	Littlejohn Coliseum (4,788); Clemson, SC
December 11, 2022*; 4:00 p.m., NBCSWA/FloHoops		Navy	L 69–71 ^{OT}	8–3	SECU Arena (2,075); Towson, MD
December 17, 2022*; 1:00 p.m.		vs. Northern Iowa; Legends of Basketball Chicago Hoops Showcase	L 66–83	8–4	United Center; Chicago, IL
December 22, 2022*; 12:00 p.m., ESPN+		at Bryant	L 59–69	8–5	Chace Athletic Center (985); Smithfield, RI
CAA regular season
December 31, 2022; 12:00 p.m., NBCSWA/FloHoops		College of Charleston	L 74–76 ^{OT}	8–6 (0–1)	SECU Arena (2,472); Towson, MD
January 5, 2023; 7:00 p.m., CBSSN		Drexel	W 64–58	9–6 (1–1)	SECU Arena (1,265); Towson, MD
January 7, 2023; 6:31 p.m., FloHoops		at Stony Brook	W 67–55	10–6 (2–1)	Island Federal Arena (2,125); Stony Brook, NY
January 11, 2023; 7:00 p.m., FloHoops		at Delaware	L 59–72	10–7 (2–2)	Bob Carpenter Center (1,671); Newark, DE
January 14, 2023; 3:00 p.m., CBSSN		Monmouth	W 68–48	11–7 (3–2)	SECU Arena (1,801); Towson, MD
January 16, 2023; 12:00 p.m., NBCSWA/FloHoops		Hofstra	W 68–47	12–7 (4–2)	SECU Arena (2,155); Towson, MD
January 19, 2023; 7:00 p.m., FloHoops		at North Carolina A&T	W 79–67	13–7 (5–2)	Corbett Sports Center (5,700); Greensboro, NC
January 21, 2023; 4:00 p.m., FloHoops		at Elon	W 66–62	14–7 (6–2)	Schar Center (1,672); Elon, NC
January 26, 2023; 7:00 p.m., FloHoops		Northeastern	W 72–63	15–7 (7–2)	SECU Arena (1,212); Towson, MD
January 28, 2023; 4:00 p.m., NBCSWA/FloHoops		William & Mary	W 92–73	16–7 (8–2)	SECU Arena (2,325); Towson, MD
February 2, 2023; 7:00 p.m., FloHoops		at Hofstra	L 72–76	16–8 (8–3)	Mack Sports Complex (2,023); Hempstead, NY
February 8, 2023; 7:00 p.m., FloHoops		Hampton	W 86–72	17–8 (9–3)	SECU Arena (2,140); Towson, MD
February 11, 2023; 2:00 p.m., FloHoops		at Drexel	L 66–73 ^{OT}	17–9 (9–4)	Daskalakis Athletic Center (1,448); Philadelphia, PA
February 13, 2023; 7:00 p.m., FloHoops		at William & Mary	L 66–68	17–10 (9–5)	Kaplan Arena (2,005); Williamsburg, VA
February 16, 2023; 7:00 p.m., FloHoops		Delaware	W 95–72	18–10 (10–5)	SECU Arena (3,010); Towson, MD
February 18, 2023; 4:00 p.m., NBCSWA/FloHoops		North Carolina A&T	W 87–75	19–10 (11–5)	SECU Arena (3,598); Towson, MD
February 23, 2023; 7:00 p.m., CBSSN		at College of Charleston	L 75–83	19–11 (11–6)	TD Arena (5,102); Charleston, SC
February 25, 2023; 7:00 p.m., FloHoops		at UNC Wilmington	W 57–53	20–11 (12–6)	Trask Coliseum (4,844); Wilmington, NC
CAA tournament
March 5, 2023; 8:30 p.m., FloHoops	(3)	vs. (6) Delaware; Quarterfinals	W 86–60	21–11	Entertainment and Sports Arena (2,089); Washington, D.C.
March 6, 2023; 8:30 p.m., CBSSN	(3)	vs. (2) College of Charleston; Semifinals	L 72–77	21–12	Entertainment and Sports Arena; Washington, D.C.
*Non-conference game. ^{#}Rankings from AP poll. (#) Tournament seedings in parentheses. All times are in Eastern.
