= 2022–23 Mercer Bears men's basketball team =

American college basketball season

2022–23 Mercer Bears men's basketball
- Conference: Southern Conference
- Record: 14–19 (6–12 SoCon)
- Head coach: Greg Gary (4th season)
- Assistant coaches: Bobby Kummer; Kim Lewis; D.J. Byrd
- Home arena: Hawkins Arena

2022–23 Southern Conference men's basketball standings
	Conf.				Overall
Team	W		L	PCT	W		L	PCT
Furman †	15	–	3	.833	28	–	8	.778
Samford	15	–	3	.833	21	–	11	.656
UNC Greensboro	14	–	4	.778	20	–	12	.625
Western Carolina	10	–	8	.556	18	–	16	.529
East Tennessee State	8	–	10	.444	12	–	20	.375
Wofford	8	–	10	.444	17	–	16	.515
Chattanooga	7	–	11	.389	18	–	17	.514
Mercer	6	–	12	.333	14	–	19	.424
The Citadel	5	–	13	.278	10	–	22	.313
VMI	2	–	16	.111	7	–	25	.219
† 2023 SoCon tournament winner

The 2022–23 Mercer Bears men's basketball team represented Mercer University in the 2022–23 NCAA Division I men's basketball season. The Bears, led by fourth-year head coach Greg Gary, played their home games at Hawkins Arena in Macon, Georgia as a member of the Southern Conference (SoCon).

The Bears finished the season 14–19, 6–12 in SoCon play, to finish in eighth place. They defeated The Citadel in the first round of the SoCon tournament before losing to Furman in the quarterfinals.

== Previous season ==
The Bears finished the 2021–22 season 16–17, 8–10 in SoCon play, to finish in seventh place. They defeated Western Carolina in the first round of the SoCon tournament before losing to Furman in the quarterfinals.

== Roster ==
2022–23 Mercer Bears men's basketball team
Players
Coaches

Pos.	#	Name	Height	Weight	Year	Hometown
G	0	Jah Quinones	6 ft 4 in (1.93 m)	220 lb (100 kg)	Fr	Orlando, FL
G	1	Kamar Robertson	6 ft 0 in (1.83 m)	182 lb (83 kg)	Sr	Alpharetta, GA
G	2	Michael Zanoni	6 ft 5 in (1.96 m)	185 lb (84 kg)	Fr	Charlotte, NC
C	3	Shannon Grant	6 ft 10 in (2.08 m)	280 lb (127 kg)	Jr	Sylacauga, AL
F	5	Jalyn McCreary	6 ft 8 in (2.03 m)	220 lb (100 kg)	RS Jr	Marietta, GA
G	10	Jordan Jones	6 ft 0 in (1.83 m)	175 lb (79 kg)	So	Macon, GA
G/F	11	Luis Jr. Hurtado	6 ft 7 in (2.01 m)	215 lb (98 kg)	GS	Mérida, Venezuela
SG	12	Harrison Drake	6 ft 3 in (1.91 m)	180 lb (82 kg)	Sr	Newnan, GA
F	14	TJ Grant	6 ft 5 in (1.96 m)	185 lb (84 kg)	Fr	Kathleen, GA
F	15	John Treanor	6 ft 6 in (1.98 m)	210 lb (95 kg)	Jr	Roswell, GA
G	20	Braden Sparks	6 ft 0 in (1.83 m)	185 lb (84 kg)	Fr	Villa Rica, GA
G	22	Jalen Cobb	6 ft 1 in (1.85 m)	175 lb (79 kg)	GS	Decatur, GA
F	23	James III Glisson	6 ft 7 in (2.01 m)	240 lb (109 kg)	Sr	Decatur, GA
G	25	Shawn Jr. Walker	6 ft 6 in (1.98 m)	202 lb (92 kg)	Sr	Elizabeth City, NC
G	30	Diego Rivera	6 ft 2 in (1.88 m)	180 lb (82 kg)	Sr	Bayamón, Puerto Rico
C	32	David Craig	7 ft 2 in (2.18 m)	235 lb (107 kg)	Fr	Johannesburg, South Africa

Head coach

- Greg Gary (Tulane)

Assistant coach(es)

- Bobby Kummer (Charlotte)
- Kim Lewis (Tulane)
- D.J. Byrd (Purdue)

Legend

- (C) Team captain
- (S) Suspended
- (I) Ineligible
- (W) Walk-on
- Injured
- Current redshirt

Roster
Last update: December 22, 2022

== Schedule and results ==
Date time, TV	Rank^{#}	Opponent^{#}	Result	Record	Site (attendance) city, state
Exhibition
November 3, 2022*; 7:00 p.m., ESPN+		LaGrange	W 107–56	–	Hawkins Arena; Macon, GA
Non-conference regular season
November 8, 2022*; 7:00 p.m., ESPN+		at East Carolina	L 75–77	0–1	Williams Arena (4,610); Greenville, NC
November 11, 2022*; 5:30 p.m., ESPN+		Milligan	W 118–64	1–1	Hawkins Arena (300); Macon, GA
November 15, 2022*; 7:00 p.m., ESPN+		at Georgia State	L 83–85 ^{OT}	1–2	GSU Convocation Center (1,607); Atlanta, GA
November 19, 2022*; 2:00 p.m., ESPN+		Winthrop	W 77–68	2–2	Hawkins Arena (964); Macon, GA
November 21, 2022*; 6:30 p.m., ACCN		at Florida State	L 72–81	2–3	Donald L. Tucker Center (4,454); Tallahassee, FL
November 25, 2022*; 9:00 p.m., BeTheBeast		vs. Robert Morris; Hostilo Community Classic	W 72–66	3–3	Enmarket Arena (287); Savannah, GA
November 26, 2022*; 7:30 p.m., BeTheBeast		vs. Fairfield; Hostilo Community Classic	W 60–58	4–3	Enmarket Arena (302); Savannah, GA
November 27, 2022*; 5:00 p.m., BeTheBeast		vs. Towson; Hostilo Community Classic	L 60–70	4–4	Enmarket Arena (215); Savannah, GA
December 2, 2022*; 7:00 p.m., ESPN+		Kennesaw State	L 63–66	4–5	Hawkins Arena (958); Macon, GA
December 6, 2022*; 11:00 a.m., ESPN+		Middle Georgia State	W 100–62	5–5	Hawkins Arena (3,000); Macon, GA
December 10, 2022*; 7:00 p.m., ESPN+		at Florida Gulf Coast	L 62–67	5–6	Alico Arena (2,103); Fort Myers, FL
December 17, 2022*; 2:00 p.m., ESPN+		Morehead State	W 79–52	6–6	Hawkins Arena (1,572); Macon, GA
December 21, 2022*; 7:00 p.m., ESPN+		at Troy	W 82–79	7–6	Trojan Arena (2,081); Troy, AL
SoCon regular season
December 28, 2022; 7:00 p.m., ESPNU		at Samford	L 69–78	7–7 (0–1)	Pete Hanna Center (2,113); Homewood, AL
December 31, 2022; 2:00 p.m., ESPN+		Chattanooga	L 51–80	7–8 (0–2)	Hawkins Arena; Macon, GA
January 4, 2023; 7:00 p.m., ESPN+		Wofford	L 52–53	7–9 (0–3)	Hawkins Arena (1,327); Macon, GA
January 7, 2023; 4:00 p.m., ESPN+		at Western Carolina	L 45–73	7–10 (0–4)	Ramsey Center (1,137); Cullowhee, NC
January 11, 2023; 7:00 p.m., ESPN+		Furman	L 66–84	7–11 (0–5)	Hawkins Arena (1,727); Macon, GA
January 14, 2023; 4:00 p.m., ESPN+		at East Tennessee State	W 68–55	8–11 (1–5)	Freedom Hall Civic Center (3,026); Johnson City, TN
January 19, 2023; 7:00 p.m., ESPN+		at VMI	W 69–61	9–11 (2–5)	Cameron Hall (550); Lexington, VA
January 21, 2023; 4:00 p.m., ESPN+		at UNC Greensboro	L 48–59	9–12 (2–6)	Greensboro Coliseum (1,479); Greensboro, NC
January 25, 2023; 7:00 p.m., ESPN+		East Tennessee State	W 71–67 ^{OT}	10–12 (3–6)	Hawkins Arena (1,727); Macon, GA
January 28, 2023; 1:00 p.m., ESPN+		at The Citadel	W 74–65	11–12 (4–6)	McAlister Field House (1,171); Charleston, SC
February 2, 2023; 7:00 p.m., ESPN+		UNC Greensboro	L 49–69	11–13 (4–7)	Hawkins Arena (2,572); Macon, GA
February 4, 2023; 2:00 p.m., ESPN+		VMI	W 80–54	12–13 (5–7)	Hawkins Arena (3,107); Macon, GA
February 8, 2023; 7:00 p.m., ESPN+		Samford	L 69–70 ^{OT}	12–14 (5–8)	Hawkins Arena (2,872); Macon, GA
February 11, 2023; 3:30 p.m., ESPN+		at Chattanooga	L 56–73	12–15 (5–9)	McKenzie Arena (3,680); Chattanooga, TN
February 15, 2023; 7:00 p.m., ESPN+		at Wofford	L 67–70	12–16 (5–10)	Jerry Richardson Indoor Stadium (1,022); Spartanburg, SC
February 18, 2023; 2:00 p.m., ESPN+		Western Carolina	L 68–71	12–17 (5–11)	Hawkins Arena (2,164); Macon, GA
February 22, 2023; 7:00 p.m., ESPN+		at Furman	L 67–70	12–18 (5–12)	Timmons Arena (1,827); Greenville, SC
February 25, 2023; 2:00 p.m., ESPN+		The Citadel	W 72–50	13–18 (6–12)	Hawkins Arena (2,573); Macon, GA
SoCon tournament
March 3, 2023; 5:00 p.m., ESPN+	(8)	vs. (9) The Citadel; First round	W 66–41	14–18	Harrah's Cherokee Center; Asheville, NC
March 4, 2023; 12:00 p.m., ESPN+	(8)	vs. (1) Furman; Quarterfinals	L 58–73	14–19	Harrah's Cherokee Center; Asheville, NC
*Non-conference game. ^{#}Rankings from AP poll. (#) Tournament seedings in parentheses. All times are in Eastern.
