= 2022–23 East Tennessee State Buccaneers men's basketball team =

American college basketball season

2022–23 East Tennessee State Buccaneers men's basketball
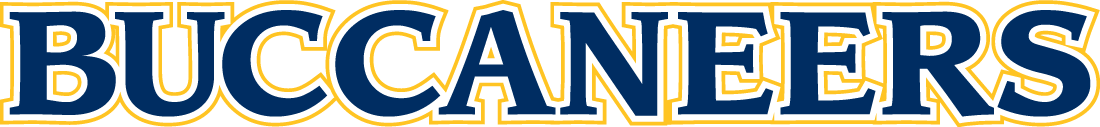
- Conference: Southern Conference
- Record: 12–20 (8–10 SoCon)
- Head coach: Desmond Oliver (2nd season)
- Assistant coaches: Mark Bialkoski; Joe Hugley; Vince Martin
- Home arena: Freedom Hall Civic Center

2022–23 Southern Conference men's basketball standings
	Conf.				Overall
Team	W		L	PCT	W		L	PCT
Furman †	15	–	3	.833	28	–	8	.778
Samford	15	–	3	.833	21	–	11	.656
UNC Greensboro	14	–	4	.778	20	–	12	.625
Western Carolina	10	–	8	.556	18	–	16	.529
East Tennessee State	8	–	10	.444	12	–	20	.375
Wofford	8	–	10	.444	17	–	16	.515
Chattanooga	7	–	11	.389	18	–	17	.514
Mercer	6	–	12	.333	14	–	19	.424
The Citadel	5	–	13	.278	10	–	22	.313
VMI	2	–	16	.111	7	–	25	.219
† 2023 SoCon tournament winner

The 2022–23 East Tennessee State Buccaneers men's basketball team represented East Tennessee State University (ETSU) in the 2022–23 NCAA Division I men's basketball season. The Buccaneers, led by second-year head coach Desmond Oliver, played their home games at the Freedom Hall Civic Center in Johnson City, Tennessee as members of the Southern Conference (SoCon). They finished the season 12–20, 8–10 in SoCon play, to finish in a tie for fifth place. As the No. 5 seed in the SoCon tournament, they lost to Western Carolina in the quarterfinals.

On March 10, 2023, the school fired head coach Desmond Oliver. On March 21, the school named former ETSU and Wake Forest assistant coach Brooks Savage the team's new head coach.

== Previous season ==
The Buccaneers finished the 2021–22 season 15–17, 7–11 in SoCon play, to finish in eighth place. They lost to The Citadel in the first round of the SoCon tournament.

== Roster ==
2022–23 East Tennessee State Buccaneers men's basketball team
Players
Coaches

Pos.	#	Name	Height	Weight	Year	Hometown
F	0	Jeremy Gregory	6 ft 6 in (1.98 m)	230 lb (104 kg)	Fr	Charlotte, NC
G	1	Jamarius Hairston	6 ft 3 in (1.91 m)	193 lb (88 kg)	GS	Salisbury, NC
G	2	Jordan King	6 ft 0 in (1.83 m)	175 lb (79 kg)	Jr	Albany, NY
G	3	DeAnthony Tipler	5 ft 10 in (1.78 m)	170 lb (77 kg)	Sr	Ashland, MS
G	4	Kristian Shaw	6 ft 5 in (1.96 m)	205 lb (93 kg)	Fr	Hendersonville, TN
G	5	Allen Strothers	6 ft 1 in (1.85 m)	170 lb (77 kg)	RS Fr	Newport News, VA
F	10	Josh Taylor	6 ft 8 in (2.03 m)	205 lb (93 kg)	Jr	Atlanta, GA
F	11	Jalen Haynes	6 ft 8 in (2.03 m)	255 lb (116 kg)	So	Fort Lauderdale, FL
G	12	Justice Smith	6 ft 6 in (1.98 m)	215 lb (98 kg)	RS So	Lyons, NY
F	13	Brock Jancek	6 ft 8 in (2.03 m)	225 lb (102 kg)	GS	Knoxville, TN
G	15	Cameron George	6 ft 3 in (1.91 m)	185 lb (84 kg)	So	Knoxville, TN
F	20	Kordell Charles	6 ft 8 in (2.03 m)	205 lb (93 kg)	So	Ontario, Canada
F	22	Jaden Seymour	6 ft 8 in (2.03 m)	205 lb (93 kg)	So	Charlotte, NC
F	23	Braden Ilic	6 ft 9 in (2.06 m)	225 lb (102 kg)	Fr	Morristown, TN

Head coach

- Desmond Oliver (Dominican (NY))

Assistant coach(es)

- Mark Bialkoski (Georgia Southern)
- Joe Hugley (East Tennessee State)
- Vince Martin (Jacksonville)

Legend

- (C) Team captain
- (S) Suspended
- (I) Ineligible
- (W) Walk-on
- Injured
- Current redshirt

Roster
Last update: October 7, 2025

== Schedule and results ==
Date time, TV	Rank^{#}	Opponent^{#}	Result	Record	Site (attendance) city, state
Exhibition
November 4, 2022*; 6:00 p.m.		Limestone	W 71–56	–	Freedom Hall Civic Center (2,478); Johnson City, TN
Non-conference regular season
November 7, 2022*; 7:00 p.m., ESPN+		Emory & Henry	W 88–66	1–0	Freedom Hall Civic Center (2,516); Johnson City, TN
November 11, 2022*; 8:30 p.m., ESPN+		vs. Elon; Asheville Championship semifinals	W 77–64	2–0	Harrah's Cherokee Center; Asheville, NC
November 13, 2022*; 4:30 p.m., ESPNU		vs. Louisiana; Asheville Championship final	L 77–81	2–1	Harrah's Cherokee Center (1,221); Asheville, NC
November 17, 2022*; 7:00 p.m., ESPN+		Little Rock	W 84–76	3–1	Freedom Hall Civic Center (2,814); Johnson City, TN
November 20, 2022*; 4:00 p.m., ESPN+		at Tennessee Tech	L 62–69	3–2	Eblen Center (787); Cookeville, TN
November 23, 2022*; 7:00 p.m., ESPN+		Appalachian State	L 70–74	3–3	Freedom Hall Civic Center (3,825); Johnson City, TN
November 27, 2022*; 1:00 p.m., SECN		at Georgia	L 47–62	3–4	Stegeman Coliseum (7,202); Athens, GA
November 30, 2022*; 7:00 p.m., ESPN+		Mars Hill	W 84–56	4–4	Freedom Hall Civic Center (2,671); Johnson City, TN
December 3, 2022*; 4:00 p.m., ESPN+		Jacksonville State	L 61–63	4–5	Freedom Hall Civic Center (3,205); Johnson City, TN
December 11, 2022*; 2:00 p.m., ESPN+		at Morehead State	L 57–61	4–6	Ellis Johnson Arena (1,565); Morehead, KY
December 14, 2022*; 7:00 p.m., ESPN+		Queens	L 75–78	4–7	Freedom Hall Civic Center (2,240); Johnson City, TN
December 17, 2022*; 4:00 p.m., ESPN+		UNC Asheville	L 73–74	4–8	Freedom Hall Civic Center (3,007); Johnson City, TN
December 22, 2022*; 8:00 p.m., ESPN+		at LSU	L 68–72	4–9	Pete Maravich Assembly Center (9,059); Baton Rouge, LA
SoCon regular season
December 29, 2022; 7:00 p.m., ESPN+		at Wofford	W 73–71	5–9 (1–0)	Jerry Richardson Indoor Stadium (1,225); Spartanburg, SC
December 31, 2022; 1:00 p.m., ESPN+		at VMI	W 64–50	6–9 (2–0)	Cameron Hall (750); Lexington, VA
January 4, 2023; 7:00 p.m., ESPN+		Western Carolina	L 60–71	6–10 (2–1)	Freedom Hall Civic Center (3,104); Johnson City, TN
January 7, 2023; 4:00 p.m., ESPN+		Furman	L 56–70	6-11 (2-2)	Freedom Hall Civic Center (4,136); Johnson City, TN
January 11, 2023; 7:00 p.m., ESPN+		at The Citadel	W 96–74	7–11 (3–2)	McAlister Field House (1,073); Charleston, SC
January 14, 2023; 4:00 p.m., ESPN+		Mercer	L 55–68	7-12 (3-3)	Freedom Hall Civic Center (3,026); Johnson City, TN
January 18, 2023; 7:00 p.m., ESPN+		Samford	L 59–69	7-13 (3-4)	Freedom Hall Civic Center (2,894); Johnson City, TN
January 21, 2023; 7:00 p.m., ESPN+		at Chattanooga	W 78–62	8-13 (4-4)	McKenzie Arena (3,751); Chattanooga, TN
January 25, 2023; 7:00 p.m., ESPN+		at Mercer	L 67–71 ^{OT}	8-14 (4-5)	Hawkins Arena (1,727); Macon, GA
January 28, 2023; 4:00 p.m., ESPN+		Chattanooga	L 64–73	8-15 (4-6)	Freedom Hall Civic Center (3,914); Johnson City, TN
February 1, 2023; 7:00 p.m., ESPN+		Wofford	W 77–52	9-15 (5-6)	Freedom Hall Civic Center (2,469); Johnson City, TN
February 4, 2023; 3:00 p.m., ESPN+		at Samford	L 62–73	9–16 (5–7)	Pete Hanna Center (2,836); Homewood, AL
February 8, 2023; 7:00 p.m., ESPNU		at UNC Greensboro	L 65–91	9–17 (5–8)	Greensboro Coliseum (1,476); Greensboro, NC
February 10, 2023; 7:00 p.m., ESPN+		VMI	W 69–65	10–17 (6–8)	Freedom Hall Civic Center (3,063); Johnson City, TN
February 15, 2023; 7:00 p.m., ESPN+		at Western Carolina	L 66–68	10–18 (6–9)	Ramsey Center (1,634); Cullowhee, NC
February 18, 2023; 6:00 p.m., ESPNU		at Furman	L 79–83	10–19 (6–10)	Timmons Arena (2,129); Greenville, SC
February 22, 2023; 7:00 p.m., ESPN+		The Citadel	W 78–70	11–19 (7–10)	Freedom Hall Civic Center (3,478); Johnson City, TN
February 25, 2023; 4:00 p.m., ESPN+		UNC Greensboro	W 63–62	12–19 (8–10)	Freedom Hall Civic Center (3,652); Johnson City, TN
SoCon tournament
March 4, 2023; 2:30 p.m., ESPN+	(5)	vs. (4) Western Carolina; Quarterfinals	L 57–69	12–20	Harrah's Cherokee Center (4,851); Asheville, NC
*Non-conference game. ^{#}Rankings from AP poll. (#) Tournament seedings in parentheses. All times are in Eastern.
