= 2022–23 Wofford Terriers men's basketball team =

American college basketball season

2022–23 Wofford Terriers men's basketball
- Conference: Southern Conference
- Record: 17–16 (8–10 SoCon)
- Head coach: Dwight Perry (interim)
- Assistant coaches: Will Murphy; Tysor Anderson; David Kaplan
- Home arena: Jerry Richardson Indoor Stadium

2022–23 Southern Conference men's basketball standings
	Conf.				Overall
Team	W		L	PCT	W		L	PCT
Furman †	15	–	3	.833	28	–	8	.778
Samford	15	–	3	.833	21	–	11	.656
UNC Greensboro	14	–	4	.778	20	–	12	.625
Western Carolina	10	–	8	.556	18	–	16	.529
East Tennessee State	8	–	10	.444	12	–	20	.375
Wofford	8	–	10	.444	17	–	16	.515
Chattanooga	7	–	11	.389	18	–	17	.514
Mercer	6	–	12	.333	14	–	19	.424
The Citadel	5	–	13	.278	10	–	22	.313
VMI	2	–	16	.111	7	–	25	.219
† 2023 SoCon tournament winner

The 2022–23 Wofford Terriers men's basketball team represented Wofford College in the 2022–23 NCAA Division I men's basketball season. The Terriers, led by interim head coach Dwight Perry, played their home games at Jerry Richardson Indoor Stadium in Spartanburg, South Carolina as a member of the Southern Conference (SoCon). They finished the season 17–16, 8–10 in SoCon play, to finish in a tie for fifth place. As the No. 6 seed in the SoCon tournament, they defeated UNC Greensboro in the quarterfinals before losing to Chattanooga in the semifinals.

On December 30, 2022, fourth-year head coach Jay McAuley resigned, after being on a leave of absence since December 5. Assistant coach Dwight Perry served as the interim head coach for the remainder of the season. On March 21, 2023, the school made Perry the permanent head coach.

== Previous season ==
The Terriers finished the 2021–22 season 19–13, 10–8 in SoCon play, to finish in a tie for third place. In the SoCon tournament, they defeated VMI in the quarterfinals, before falling to Chattanooga in the semifinals. They were invited to participate in The Basketball Classic, but were forced to withdraw, due to a "variety of logistical factors".

== Roster ==
2022–23 Wofford Terriers men's basketball team
Players
Coaches

Pos.	#	Name	Height	Weight	Year	Hometown
G	0	Jackson Sivills	6 ft 6 in (1.98 m)	207 lb (94 kg)	So	Paducah, KY
G	1	Jackson Paveletzke	6 ft 3 in (1.91 m)	175 lb (79 kg)	Fr	Kimberly, WI
G	2	Tauris Watson	6 ft 3 in (1.91 m)	190 lb (86 kg)	So	Lexington, SC
G	4	Josh Morissette	6 ft 4 in (1.93 m)	205 lb (93 kg)	Fr	Exeter, NH
G	5	Chase Martin	6 ft 5 in (1.96 m)	210 lb (95 kg)	Fr	Jenks, OK
G	10	Corey Tripp	6 ft 3 in (1.91 m)	195 lb (88 kg)	So	Medina, OH
F	11	Amarri Tice	6 ft 7 in (2.01 m)	220 lb (100 kg)	Fr	Newburgh, NY
G	12	Carson McCorkle	6 ft 3 in (1.91 m)	193 lb (88 kg)	So	Raleigh, NC
G	13	Adam Silas	6 ft 3 in (1.91 m)	175 lb (79 kg)	Fr	Vauxhall, NJ
C	14	Kyler Filewich	6 ft 9 in (2.06 m)	250 lb (113 kg)	Jr	Winnipeg, MB
G	15	Cohen Kellogg	6 ft 0 in (1.83 m)	165 lb (75 kg)	Fr	Orono, MN
G	21	Joe Spinelli	6 ft 0 in (1.83 m)	170 lb (77 kg)	Fr	Watertown, MA
G	22	Jonathan Steelman	6 ft 3 in (1.91 m)	180 lb (82 kg)	Sr	Aiken, SC
F	25	Messiah Jones	6 ft 6 in (1.98 m)	220 lb (100 kg)	Sr	Chicago, IL
G	30	Anthony Jr. Arrington	6 ft 2 in (1.88 m)	190 lb (86 kg)	Fr	Atlanta, GA
F/C	33	B.J. Mack	6 ft 8 in (2.03 m)	245 lb (111 kg)	Sr	Charlotte, NC

Head coach

- Dwight Perry (interim; Kentucky)

Assistant coach(es)

- Will Murphy (Wake Forest)
- Tysor Anderson (Georgia Tech)
- David Kaplan (High Point)

Legend

- (C) Team captain
- (S) Suspended
- (I) Ineligible
- (W) Walk-on
- Injured
- Current redshirt

Roster
Last update: January 5, 2023

== Schedule and results ==
Date time, TV	Rank^{#}	Opponent^{#}	Result	Record	High points	High rebounds	High assists	Site (attendance) city, state
Non-conference regular season
November 7, 2022*; 7:00 p.m., ESPN+		Bob Jones	W 120–48	1–0	16 – 2 tied	11 – 2 tied	4 – Paveletzke	Jerry Richardson Indoor Stadium (1,679); Spartanburg, SC
November 12, 2022*; 4:00 p.m., ESPN+		at High Point	L 80–91	1–1	21 – Mack	7 – Filewich	5 – Tripp	Qubein Center (3,765); High Point, NC
November 14, 2022*; 8:00 p.m., ESPN+		at Drake	L 72–80	1–2	18 – Tripp	8 – Mack	2 – 2 tied	Knapp Center (2,529); Des Moines, IA
November 18, 2022*; 7:00 p.m., ESPN+		Gardner–Webb; Battle of the Carolinas	W 60–58	2–2	26 – Mack	6 – 2 tied	3 – Paveletzke	Jerry Richardson Indoor Stadium (1,107); Spartanburg, SC
November 20, 2022*; 5:00 p.m., ESPN+		North Carolina A&T; Battle of the Carolinas	W 78–64	3–2	21 – Paveletzke	9 – Jones	6 – 2 tied	Jerry Richardson Indoor Stadium (506); Spartanburg, SC
November 23, 2022*; 1:00 p.m., ESPN+		North Greenville	W 70–59	4–2	18 – Paveletzke	9 – Jones	6 – Paveletzke	Jerry Richardson Indoor Stadium (853); Spartanburg, SC
November 27, 2022*; 3:00 p.m., SECN+/ESPN+		at LSU	L 75–78	4–3	19 – Paveletzke	9 – Mack	5 – Paveletzke	Pete Maravich Assembly Center (8,428); Baton Rouge, LA
December 1, 2022*; 7:00 p.m., ESPN+		Presbyterian	W 76–63	5–3	16 – Jones	5 – Tice	3 – Paveletzke	Jerry Richardson Indoor Stadium (906); Spartanburg, SC
December 3, 2022*; 5:00 p.m., SECN+/ESPN+		at Vanderbilt	L 62–65	5–4	19 – Mack	6 – 2 tied	5 – Paveletzke	Memorial Gymnasium (5,822); Nashville, TN
December 6, 2022*; 7:30 p.m., ESPN+		Coastal Carolina	W 71–61	6–4	20 – Paveletzke	7 – McCorkle	4 – Silas	Jerry Richardson Indoor Stadium (914); Spartanburg, SC
December 10, 2022*; 3:00 p.m., ESPN+		at Georgia Southern	L 57–79	6–5	15 – 2 tied	4 – 3 tied	2 – Paveletzke	Hanner Fieldhouse (545); Statesboro, GA
December 17, 2022*; 2:00 p.m., ESPN+		Montreat	W 107–65	7–5	23 – Paveletzke	11 – Tice	10 – Paveletzke	Jerry Richardson Indoor Stadium (503); Spartanburg, SC
December 20, 2022*; 2:00 p.m., SECN+/ESPN+		at Texas A&M	W 67–62	8–5	22 – Paveletzke	7 – Tice	4 – Paveletzke	Reed Arena (6,518); College Station, TX
SoCon regular season
December 29, 2022; 7:00 p.m., ESPN+		East Tennessee State	L 71–73	8–6 (0–1)	17 – 2 tied	8 – Mack	3 – Martin	Jerry Richardson Indoor Stadium (1,225); Spartanburg, SC
December 31, 2022; 2:00 p.m., ESPN+		UNC Greensboro	L 64–73	8–7 (0–2)	20 – Mack	8 – Tripp	2 – 2 tied	Jerry Richardson Indoor Stadium (819); Spartanburg, SC
January 4, 2023; 7:00 p.m., ESPN+		at Mercer	W 53–52	9–7 (1–2)	12 – Paveletzke	7 – Jones	3 – Silas	Hawkins Arena (1,327); Macon, GA
January 7, 2023; 7:00 p.m., ESPN+/CW62		The Citadel	W 77–57	10–7 (2–2)	18 – Mack	11 – Jones	5 – Paveletzke	Jerry Richardson Indoor Stadium (1,320); Spartanburg, SC
January 11, 2023; 8:00 p.m., ESPN+		at Samford	L 58–83	10–8 (2–3)	12 – 2 tied	4 – 3 tied	4 – Tripp	Pete Hanna Center (3,217); Homewood, AL
January 14, 2023; 7:00 p.m., ESPN+		VMI	W 86–67	11–8 (3–3)	22 – McCorkle	8 – Filewich	7 – Silas	Jerry Richardson Indoor Stadium (1,470); Spartanburg, SC
January 18, 2023; 7:00 p.m., ESPN+		at Western Carolina	L 71–76	11–9 (3–4)	19 – Tripp	7 – 2 tied	6 – Paveletzke	Ramsey Center (2,751); Cullowhee, NC
January 22, 2023; 4:00 p.m., ESPNU		Furman	L 82–96	11–10 (3–5)	25 – Paveletzke	7 – Filewich	3 – Paveletzke	Jerry Richardson Indoor Stadium (2,958); Spartanburg, SC
January 25, 2023; 7:00 p.m., ESPN+		at Chattanooga	W 85–80	12–10 (4–5)	21 – Paveletzke	8 – Mack	6 – Paveletzke	McKenzie Arena (2,908); Chattanooga, TN
January 28, 2023; 2:00 p.m., CBSSN		Samford	W 85–77	13–10 (5–5)	21 – Paveletzke	6 – Mack	3 – 2 tied	Jerry Richardson Indoor Stadium (1,866); Spartanburg, SC
February 1, 2023; 7:00 p.m., ESPN+		at East Tennessee State	L 52–77	13–11 (5–6)	10 – 2 tied	5 – 2 tied	4 – Silas	Freedom Hall Civic Center (2,469); Johnson City, TN
February 4, 2023; 6:00 p.m., CBSSN		at Furman	L 67–80	13–12 (5–7)	17 – Mack	8 – Mack	5 – Paveletzke	Bon Secours Wellness Arena (6,199); Greenville, SC
February 8, 2023; 7:00 p.m., ESPN+		Western Carolina	L 91–95 ^{2OT}	13–13 (5–8)	22 – Mack	9 – 2 tied	4 – Jones	Jerry Richardson Indoor Stadium (1,194); Spartanburg, SC
February 12, 2023; 3:00 p.m., ESPN+		at UNC Greensboro	L 89–97 ^{OT}	13–14 (5–9)	28 – Mack	11 – Jones	4 – Paveletzke	Greensboro Coliseum (1,349); Greensboro, NC
February 15, 2023; 7:00 p.m., ESPN+		Mercer	W 70–67	14–14 (6–9)	22 – Mack	4 – 3 tied	4 – Paveletzke	Jerry Richardson Indoor Stadium (1,022); Spartanburg, SC
February 18, 2023; 1:00 p.m., ESPN+		at The Citadel	W 72–68	15–14 (7–9)	16 – Mack	7 – Jones	7 – Paveletzke	McAlister Field House (1,837); Charleston, SC
February 22, 2023; 7:00 p.m., ESPN+		at VMI	L 83–87 ^{OT}	15–15 (7–10)	21 – Mack	9 – Jones	4 – Paveletzke	Cameron Hall (550); Lexington, VA
February 25, 2023; 7:00 p.m., ESPN+/CW62		Chattanooga	W 86–74	16–15 (8–10)	19 – Mack	9 – Jones	3 – 2 tied	Jerry Richardson Indoor Stadium (1,941); Spartanburg, SC
SoCon tournament
March 4, 2023; 8:30 p.m., ESPN+	(6)	vs. (3) UNC Greensboro; Quarterfinals	W 67–66	17–15	16 – Mack	8 – Mack	7 – Tripp	Harrah's Cherokee Center (3,995); Asheville, NC
March 5, 2023; 6:30 p.m., ESPNU	(6)	vs. (7) Chattanooga; Semifinals	L 62–74	17–16	20 – Paveletzke	7 – 2 tied	2 – Paveletzke	Harrah's Cherokee Center (5,367); Asheville, NC
*Non-conference game. ^{#}Rankings from AP poll. (#) Tournament seedings in parentheses. All times are in Eastern.
