= 2022–23 The Citadel Bulldogs basketball team =

American college basketball season

2022–23 The Citadel Bulldogs basketball
- Conference: Southern Conference
- Record: 10–22 (5–13 SoCon)
- Head coach: Ed Conroy (1st, 5th overall season)
- Assistant coaches: John Reynolds; Patrick Reilingh; Chris Hill
- Home arena: McAlister Field House

2022–23 Southern Conference men's basketball standings
	Conf.				Overall
Team	W		L	PCT	W		L	PCT
Furman †	15	–	3	.833	28	–	8	.778
Samford	15	–	3	.833	21	–	11	.656
UNC Greensboro	14	–	4	.778	20	–	12	.625
Western Carolina	10	–	8	.556	18	–	16	.529
East Tennessee State	8	–	10	.444	12	–	20	.375
Wofford	8	–	10	.444	17	–	16	.515
Chattanooga	7	–	11	.389	18	–	17	.514
Mercer	6	–	12	.333	14	–	19	.424
The Citadel	5	–	13	.278	10	–	22	.313
VMI	2	–	16	.111	7	–	25	.219
† 2023 SoCon tournament winner

The 2022–23 The Citadel Bulldogs basketball team represented The Citadel, The Military College of South Carolina in the 2022–23 NCAA Division I men's basketball season. The Bulldogs played their home games at McAlister Field House in Charleston, South Carolina, as members of the Southern Conference. The Citadel rehired head coach Ed Conroy for his second stint as head coach at his alma mater after the 2021–22 season. This was his fifth season overall as head coach of the Bulldogs.

== Previous season ==
The Bulldogs finished the season 13–18, 6–12 in SoCon play, to finish in ninth place. They defeated East Tennessee State in the first round of the SoCon tournament before losing to Chattanooga in the quarterfinals.

On March 10, 2022, the school fired head coach Duggar Baucom. On March 23, the school named former Minnesota and Vanderbilt assistant Ed Conroy the team's new head coach. Conroy was the head coach of the Bulldogs from 2006 to 2010.

== Roster ==
2022–23 The Citadel Bulldogs men's basketball team
Players
Coaches

Pos.	#	Name	Height	Weight	Year	Hometown
F	0	Jackson Price	6 ft 8 in (2.03 m)	240 lb (109 kg)	So	Hiram, GA
F	1	Stephen Clark	6 ft 8 in (2.03 m)	205 lb (93 kg)	Sr	Charlotte, NC
G	2	AJ Smith	6 ft 4 in (1.93 m)	215 lb (98 kg)	Fr	Charlotte, NC
G	3	Rudy Fitzgibbons III	6 ft 0 in (1.83 m)	160 lb (73 kg)	Sr	Atlanta, GA
G	4	Elijah Morgan	6 ft 1 in (1.85 m)	180 lb (82 kg)	GS	New Orleans, LA
G	5	David Maynard	6 ft 4 in (1.93 m)	200 lb (91 kg)	GS	Herriman, UT
G	10	Austin Ash	6 ft 3 in (1.91 m)	185 lb (84 kg)	GS	Cedar Rapids, IA
G	11	Madison Durr	6 ft 4 in (1.93 m)	200 lb (91 kg)	Fr	Atlanta, GA
G	12	Colby McAllister	6 ft 5 in (1.96 m)	195 lb (88 kg)	Fr	Spanish Fort, AL
G	13	Mike Green	6 ft 2 in (1.88 m)	195 lb (88 kg)	GS	Myrtle Beach, SC
F	14	Brady Spence	6 ft 9 in (2.06 m)	220 lb (100 kg)	Sr	Douglasville, GA
G	15	Kaylan Makan	6 ft 2 in (1.88 m)	170 lb (77 kg)	Fr	Little Rock, AR
G	20	Josh Davis	6 ft 2 in (1.88 m)	175 lb (79 kg)	Fr	Southlake, TX
F	21	Cole Alexander	6 ft 6 in (1.98 m)	200 lb (91 kg)	Fr	Charleston, SC
F	23	Tony Carpio	6 ft 8 in (2.03 m)	220 lb (100 kg)	Fr	Suwanee, GA
G	24	Dylan Engler	6 ft 5 in (1.96 m)	190 lb (86 kg)	Jr	Oswego, IL
F	32	Bailey Conrad	6 ft 7 in (2.01 m)	230 lb (104 kg)	Jr	Corydon, IN
G	33	John-Michael Hughes	6 ft 1 in (1.85 m)	175 lb (79 kg)	GS	Ligonier, PA

Head coach

- Ed Conroy (The Citadel)

Assistant coach(es)

- John Reynolds (The Citadel)
- Patrick Reilingh (Louisville)
- Chris Hill (Milwaukee)

Legend

- (C) Team captain
- (S) Suspended
- (I) Ineligible
- (W) Walk-on
- Injured
- Current redshirt

Roster
Last update: November 12, 2022

== Schedule and results ==
Date time, TV	Rank^{#}	Opponent^{#}	Result	Record	Site (attendance) city, state
Exhibition
October 30, 2022*; 4:00 pm		Mars Hill	W 93–73	–	McAlister Field House; Charleston, SC
Regular season
November 7, 2022*; 7:00 pm, ACCNX/ESPN+		at Clemson	L 69–80	0–1	Littlejohn Coliseum (4,768); Clemson, SC
November 10, 2022*; 7:00 pm, ESPN+		Presbyterian	W 70–58	1–1	McAlister Field House (1,035); Charleston, SC
November 15, 2022*; 7:00 pm, ESPN+		Morris	W 109–66	2–1	McAlister Field House (601); Charleston, SC
November 19, 2022*; 7:00 pm, FS2		at Butler	L 42–89	2–2	Hinkle Fieldhouse (7,520); Indianapolis, IN
November 23, 2022*; 7:00 pm, ESPN+		at New Orleans; Big Easy Classic	W 72–65	3–2	Lakefront Arena (897); New Orleans, LA
November 24, 2022*; 7:00 pm, ESPN+		vs. Denver; Big Easy Classic	L 71–74	3–3	Lakefront Arena (213); New Orleans, LA
November 25, 2022*; 7:00 pm, ESPN+		vs. IUPUI; Big Easy Classic	W 74–53	4–3	Lakefront Arena (254); New Orleans, LA
November 30, 2022*; 7:00 pm, ESPN+		at Charleston Southern	W 76–73	5–3	Buccaneer Field House (917); North Charleston, SC
December 3, 2022*; 1:00 pm, ESPN+		College of Charleston	L 57–79	5–4	McAlister Field House (4,360); Charleston, SC
December 13, 2022*; 7:00 pm, ESPN2		at North Carolina	L 67–100	5–5	Dean Smith Center (16,926); Chapel Hill, NC
December 17, 2022*; 1:00 pm, ESPN+		Longwood	L 70–75	5–6	McAlister Field House (789); Charleston, SC
December 20, 2022*; 7:00 pm, NCCU Sports Network		at North Carolina Central	L 74–81	5–7	McDougald–McLendon Arena (1,033); Durham, NC
December 29, 2022; 7:00 pm, ESPN+		Chattanooga	W 76–68	6–7 (1–0)	McAlister Field House (1,237); Charleston, SC
December 31, 2022; 1:00 pm, ESPN+		Samford	L 63–75	6–8 (1–1)	McAlister Field House (871); Charleston, SC
January 4, 2023; 7:00 pm, ESPN+		at Furman	L 72–97	6–9 (1–2)	Timmons Arena (1,637); Greenville, SC
January 7, 2023; 7:00 pm, ESPN+		at Wofford	L 57–77	6–10 (1–3)	Jerry Richardson Indoor Stadium (1,320); Spartanburg, SC
January 11, 2023; 7:00 pm, ESPN+		East Tennessee State	L 74–96	6–11 (1–4)	McAlister Field House (1,073); Charleston, SC
January 14, 2023; 1:00 pm, ESPN+		Western Carolina	W 65–61	7–11 (2–4)	McAlister Field House (1,467); Charleston, SC
January 19, 2023; 7:00 pm, ESPN+		at UNC Greensboro	L 60–70	7–12 (2–5)	Greensboro Coliseum (1,347); Greensboro, NC
January 21, 2023; 1:00 pm, ESPN+		at VMI	W 60–52	8–12 (3–5)	Cameron Hall (3,625); Lexington, VA
January 25, 2023; 7:00 pm, ESPN+		at Western Carolina	W 81–70	9–12 (4–5)	Ramsey Center (2,021); Cullowhee, NC
January 28, 2023; 1:00 pm, ESPN+		Mercer	L 65–74	9–13 (4–6)	McAlister Field House (1,171); Charleston, SC
January 30, 2023*; 7:00 pm, ESPN+		Chicago State	L 75–76	9–14	McAlister Field House (735); Charleston, SC
February 2, 2023; 7:00 pm, ESPN+		VMI	L 69–75	9–15 (4–7)	McAlister Field House (1,682); Charleston, SC
February 4, 2023; 1:00 pm, ESPN+		UNC Greensboro	L 59–79	9–16 (4–8)	McAlister Field House (3,451); Charleston, SC
February 8, 2023; 7:00 pm, ESPN+		at Chattanooga	L 63–82	9–17 (4–9)	McKenzie Arena (3,061); Chattanooga, TN
February 11, 2023; 3:00 pm, ESPN+		at Samford	L 70–76	9–18 (4–10)	Pete Hanna Center (3,100); Homewood, AL
February 15, 2023; 7:00 pm, ESPN+		Furman	W 69–65	10–18 (5–10)	McAlister Field House (1,737); Charleston, SC
February 18, 2023; 1:00 pm, ESPN+		Wofford	L 68–72	10–19 (5–11)	McAlister Field House (1,837); Charleston, SC
February 22, 2023; 7:00 pm, ESPN+		at East Tennessee State	L 70–78	10–20 (5–12)	Freedom Hall Civic Center (3,478); Johnson City, TN
February 25, 2023; 2:00 pm, ESPN+		at Mercer	L 50–72	10–21 (5–13)	Hawkins Arena (2,573); Macon, GA
SoCon tournament
March 3, 2023; 5:00 pm, ESPN+	(9)	vs. (8) Mercer; First round	L 41–66	10–22	Harrah's Cherokee Center; Asheville, NC
*Non-conference game. ^{#}Rankings from AP poll. (#) Tournament seedings in parentheses. All times are in Eastern.
