= 2022–23 Western Carolina Catamounts men's basketball team =

American college basketball season

2022–23 Western Carolina Catamounts men's basketball
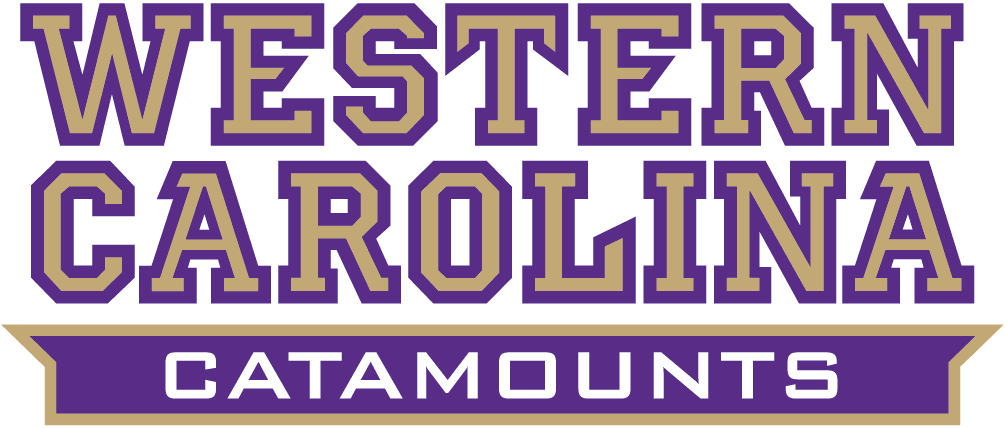

CBI, First Round
- Conference: Southern Conference
- Record: 18–16 (10–8 SoCon)
- Head coach: Justin Gray (2nd season)
- Associate head coach: Jayson Gee
- Assistant coaches: Ryne Lightfoot; Zack Freesman
- Home arena: Ramsey Center

2022–23 Southern Conference men's basketball standings
	Conf.				Overall
Team	W		L	PCT	W		L	PCT
Furman †	15	–	3	.833	28	–	8	.778
Samford	15	–	3	.833	21	–	11	.656
UNC Greensboro	14	–	4	.778	20	–	12	.625
Western Carolina	10	–	8	.556	18	–	16	.529
East Tennessee State	8	–	10	.444	12	–	20	.375
Wofford	8	–	10	.444	17	–	16	.515
Chattanooga	7	–	11	.389	18	–	17	.514
Mercer	6	–	12	.333	14	–	19	.424
The Citadel	5	–	13	.278	10	–	22	.313
VMI	2	–	16	.111	7	–	25	.219
† 2023 SoCon tournament winner

The 2022–23 Western Carolina Catamounts men's basketball team represented Western Carolina University in the 2022–23 NCAA Division I men's basketball season. The Catamounts, led by second-year head coach Justin Gray, played their home games at the Ramsey Center in Cullowhee, North Carolina, as members of the Southern Conference. They finished the season 17–14, 10–8 in SoCon play to finish in fourth place. In the SoCon tournament, they defeated East Tennessee in the quarterfinals before narrowly losing in overtime to Furman in the semifinal round. The Catamounts were invited to the CBI tournament, where they were defeated by eventual champions Charlotte in the first round.

== Previous season ==
The Catamounts finished the 2021–22 season 11–21, 5–13 in SoCon play to finish in last place. In the SoCon tournament, they were defeated by Mercer in the first round.

== Roster ==
2022–23 Western Carolina Catamounts men's basketball team
Players
Coaches

Pos.	#	Name	Height	Weight	Year	Hometown
F	0	Tyzhaun Claude	6 ft 8 in (2.03 m)	235 lb (107 kg)	RS Jr	Goldsboro, North Carolina
G	1	Russell Jones Jr.	5 ft 8 in (1.73 m)	167 lb (76 kg)	Sr	Blythewood, South Carolina
G	2	Vonterius Woolbright	6 ft 6 in (1.98 m)	208 lb (94 kg)	Sr	Albany, Georgia
G	3	Tre Jackson	6 ft 1 in (1.85 m)	181 lb (82 kg)	Sr	Columbia, South Carolina
G/F	4	Tyler Harris	6 ft 7 in (2.01 m)	199 lb (90 kg)	Sr	Charlotte, North Carolina
G	5	DJ Campbell	6 ft 2 in (1.88 m)	200 lb (91 kg)	Fr	Hampton, Virginia
G	11	Cam Bacote	6 ft 3 in (1.91 m)	176 lb (80 kg)	GS	Hampton, Virginia
G/F	12	Cinque Lemon	6 ft 7 in (2.01 m)	203 lb (92 kg)	Fr	Spring Lake, North Carolina
F	13	Marcus Kell	6 ft 8 in (2.03 m)	206 lb (93 kg)	Fr	Rock Hill, South Carolina
G	21	RaSheed Jones	6 ft 6 in (1.98 m)	178 lb (81 kg)	Fr	Marion, Indiana
F	23	Marlow Gilmore	6 ft 6 in (1.98 m)	195 lb (88 kg)	Sr	Norway, South Carolina
F	24	Bernard Pelote	6 ft 8 in (2.03 m)	217 lb (98 kg)	So	Savannah, Georgia
F	32	Colin Granger	6 ft 9 in (2.06 m)	247 lb (112 kg)	Jr	Suwanee, Georgia
G	41	Miles McClure	6 ft 4 in (1.93 m)	227 lb (103 kg)	Fr	Franklin, North Carolina
G	42	Jalen Higgins	6 ft 4 in (1.93 m)	186 lb (84 kg)	Fr	Raeford, North Carolina
G	45	Elijah Cupples	6 ft 2 in (1.88 m)	200 lb (91 kg)	RS Jr	Harrisburg, North Carolina

Head coach

- Justin Gray (Wake Forest)

Assistant coach(es)

- Jayson Gee (College of Charleston)
- Ryne Lightfoot (Bethel)
- Zack Freesman (North Florida)

Legend

- (C) Team captain
- (S) Suspended
- (I) Ineligible
- (W) Walk-on
- Injured
- Current redshirt

Roster
Last update: January 2, 2023

== Schedule and results ==
Date time, TV	Rank^{#}	Opponent^{#}	Result	Record	Site (attendance) city, state
Non-conference regular season
November 7, 2022*; 8:00 pm, SECN+/ESPN+		at Georgia	L 55–68	0–1	Stegeman Coliseum (7,757); Athens, GA
November 10, 2022*; 7:00 pm, BTN+		at Maryland	L 51–71	0–2	Xfinity Center (10,528); College Park, MD
November 13, 2022*; 4:00 pm, ESPN+		Brescia	W 112–45	1–2	Ramsey Center (1,377); Cullowhee, NC
November 18, 2022*; 5:30 pm, ESPN+		at McNeese State; McNeese State MTE	W 88–69	2–2	The Legacy Center (1,497); Lake Charles, LA
November 19, 2022*; 12:00 pm		vs. Lamar; McNeese State MTE	W 98–91 ^{OT}	3–2	The Legacy Center (221); Lake Charles, LA
November 20, 2022*; 12:00 pm		vs. Lindenwood; McNeese State MTE	W 90–88 ^{OT}	4–2	The Legacy Center (169); Lake Charles, LA
November 26, 2022*; 2:00 pm, ESPN+		at UNC Asheville	L 61–73	4–3	Kimmel Arena (1,522); Asheville, NC
November 30, 2022*; 7:00 pm, ESPN+		Gardner–Webb	L 55–71	4–4	Ramsey Center (2,125); Cullowhee, NC
December 3, 2022*; 5:30 pm, ESPN+		USC Upstate	L 64–79	4–5	Ramsey Center (1,313); Cullowhee, NC
December 7, 2022*; 7:00 pm, ESPN+		at Davidson	L 64–72	4–6	John M. Belk Arena (2,869); Davidson, NC
December 10, 2022*; 4:00 pm, ESPN+		Brevard	W 99–55	5–6	Ramsey Center (1,387); Cullowhee, NC
December 17, 2022*; 4:00 pm, ESPN+		at Tennessee Tech	W 75–65	6–6	Eblen Center (557); Cookeville, TN
December 20, 2022*; 2:00 pm, ESPN+		Toccoa Falls	W 117–50	7–6	Ramsey Center (688); Cullowhee, NC
SoCon regular season
December 29, 2022; 2:00 pm, ESPN+		UNC Greensboro	L 47–72	7–7 (0–1)	Ramsey Center (1,130); Cullowhee, NC
December 31, 2022; 4:00 pm, ESPN+		Furman	W 79–67	8–7 (1–1)	Ramsey Center (1,060); Cullowhee, NC
January 4, 2023; 7:00 pm, ESPN+		at East Tennessee State	W 71–60	9–7 (2–1)	Freedom Hall Civic Center (3,104); Johnson City, TN
January 7, 2023; 4:00 pm, ESPN+		Mercer	W 73–45	10–7 (3–1)	Ramsey Center (1,137); Cullowhee, NC
January 11, 2023; 7:00 pm, ESPN+		at Chattanooga	L 76–95	10–8 (3–2)	McKenzie Arena (3,009); Chattanooga, TN
January 14, 2023; 1:00 pm, ESPN+		at The Citadel	L 61–65	10–9 (3–3)	McAlister Field House (1,467); Charleston, SC
January 18, 2023; 7:00 pm, ESPN+		Wofford	W 76–71	11–9 (4–3)	Ramsey Center (2,75); Cullowhee, NC
January 21, 2023; 6:00 pm, ESPN+		at Samford	L 65–74	11–10 (4–4)	Pete Hanna Center (3,513); Homewood, AL
January 25, 2023; 7:00 pm, ESPN+		The Citadel	L 70–81	11–11 (4–5)	Ramsey Center (2,021); Cullowhee, NC
January 28, 2023; 1:00 pm, ESPN+		at VMI	W 71–65	12–11 (5–5)	Cameron Hall (3,265); Lexington, VA
February 1, 2023; 7:00 pm, ESPN+		Samford	L 77–85	12–12 (5–6)	Ramsey Center (1,787); Cullowhee, NC
February 4, 2023; 2:00 pm, Nexstar/ESPN+		Chattanooga	W 83–68	13–12 (6–6)	Ramsey Center (3,157); Cullowhee, NC
February 8, 2023; 7:00 pm, ESPN+		at Wofford	W 95–91 ^{2OT}	14–12 (7–6)	Jerry Richardson Indoor Stadium (1,194); Spartanburg, SC
February 11, 2023; 2:00 pm, Nexstar/ESPN+		at Furman	L 59–93	14–13 (7–7)	Timmons Arena (2,577); Greenville, SC
February 15, 2023; 7:00 pm, ESPN+		East Tennessee State	W 68–66	15–13 (8–7)	Ramsey Center (1,634); Cullowhee, NC
February 18, 2023; 2:00 pm, ESPN+		at Mercer	W 71–68	16–13 (9–7)	Hawkins Arena (2,164); Macon, GA
February 22, 2023; 7:00 pm, ESPN+		at UNC Greensboro	L 52–71	16–14 (9–8)	Greensboro Coliseum; Greensboro, NC
February 25, 2023; 4:00 pm, ESPN+		VMI	W 85–66	17–14 (10–8)	Ramsey Center (3,586); Cullowhee, NC
SoCon tournament
March 4, 2023; 2:30 pm, ESPN+	(4)	vs. (5) East Tennessee State; Quarterfinals	W 69-57	18–14	Harrah's Cherokee Center (4,851); Asheville, NC
March 5, 2023; 4:00 pm, ESPNU	(4)	vs. (1) Furman; Semifinals	L 80–83 ^{OT}	18–15	Harrah's Cherokee Center; Asheville, NC
College Basketball Invitational
March 18, 2023; 7:30 p.m., FloHoops	(14)	vs. (3) Charlotte; First round	L 56–65	18–16	Ocean Center (876); Daytona Beach, FL
*Non-conference game. ^{#}Rankings from AP Poll. (#) Tournament seedings in parentheses. All times are in Eastern.
