= Desmond Oliver (basketball) =

American basketball coach

Current position
- Title: Head coach
- Team: North Tampa Christian Academy

Biographical details
- Born: December 4, 1969 (age 56); Buffalo, New York, U.S.

Playing career
- 1988–1989: Genesee CC
- 1989–1992: Dominican (NY)

Coaching career (HC unless noted)
- 1994–1997: Niagara (assistant)
- 1997–1998: Texas A&M (assistant)
- 1998–2000: Cornell (assistant)
- 2000–2001: St. Bonaventure (assistant)
- 2001–2004: Rhode Island (assistant)
- 2004–2009: Georgia (assistant)
- 2009–2010: Canisius (assistant)
- 2010–2015: Charlotte (assistant)
- 2015–2021: Tennessee (assistant)
- 2021–2023: East Tennessee State
- 2023–2025: South Florida (assistant)
- 2025-present: North Tampa Christian Academy HS (FL)

Head coaching record
- Overall: 27–37 (.422)

Desmond L. Oliver (born December 4, 1969) is an American basketball coach who is currently the head boys' basketball coach at North Tampa Christian Academy. He previously served as an assistant coach for the South Florida Bulls.

== Playing career ==
Oliver played collegiately for one season at Genesee Community College under Bill Van Gundy, the father of Jeff and Stan, before transferring to Dominican College in New York, where he served as a team captain.

== Coaching career ==
In 1994, Oliver began his college coaching career as an assistant at Niagara where he stayed until 1997 before taking an assistant coaching position under Tony Barone at Texas A&M. Oliver would return to New York with stops at Cornell and St. Bonaventure before joining Bonnies' head coach Jim Baron at Rhode Island where he'd stay as an assistant from 2001 to 2004. From 2004 to 2009, Oliver was an assistant under Dennis Felton at Georgia and the Bulldogs' 11th place squad that won the 2008 SEC tournament title and the auto bid to the 2008 NCAA tournament.

After his time at Georgia, Oliver briefly served as an assistant coach at Canisius before a five-year stint as an assistant at Charlotte. In 2015, Oliver moved on to Tennessee to join Rick Barnes, where he would earn a reputation as one of the top recruiters in college basketball. While with the Volunteers, Oliver was on staff for a SEC regular season title in 2017–18 and a Sweet 16 appearance in 2019.

On April 5, 2021, Oliver was named the 18th head coach in East Tennessee State basketball history. In his first season at ETSU, Oliver led a young Buccaneer team to a 15–17 record, which was highlighted by winning the inaugural Naples Invitational. The Buccaneers went 12–20 in Oliver's second season, where ten of the losses were decided by 4 points or less. After two seasons, Oliver was dismissed from East Tennessee State on March 10, 2023.

In May 2023, Oliver was named as an assistant coach at the University of South Florida.

Oliver was announced as the new head boys' basketball coach at North Tampa Christian Academy in May 2025.

== Head coaching record ==
Statistics overview
Season	Team	Overall	Conference	Standing	Postseason
East Tennessee State Buccaneers (Southern Conference) (2021–2023)
2021–22	East Tennessee State	15–17	7–11	8th	
2022–23	East Tennessee State	12–20	8–10	T–5th	
East Tennessee State:		27–37 (.422)	15–21 (.417)		
Total:		27–37 (.422)			
National champion Postseason invitational champion Conference regular season champion Conference regular season and conference tournament champion Division regular season champion Division regular season and conference tournament champion Conference tournament champion
